= 1953 New Year Honours =

British royal recognitions

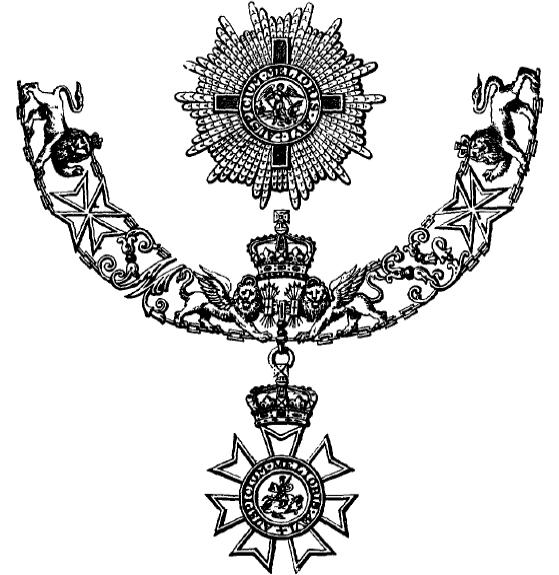
The insignia of the Grand Cross of the Order of St Michael and St George

The New Year Honours 1953 for the United Kingdom were announced on 30 December 1952, to celebrate the year passed and mark the beginning of 1953. This was the first New Year Honours since the accession of Queen Elizabeth II. The Honours list is a list of people who have been awarded one of the various orders, decorations, and medals of the United Kingdom. Honours are split into classes ("orders") and are graded to distinguish different degrees of achievement or service, most medals are not graded. The awards are presented to the recipient in one of several investiture ceremonies at Buckingham Palace throughout the year by the Sovereign or her designated representative.

The orders, medals and decorations are awarded by various honours committees which meet to discuss candidates identified by public or private bodies, by government departments or who are nominated by members of the public. Depending on their roles, those people selected by committee are submitted to Ministers for their approval before being sent to the Sovereign for final approval. As the "fount of honour" the monarch remains the final arbiter for awards. In the case of certain orders such as the Order of the Garter and the Royal Victorian Order they remain at the personal discretion of the Queen.

The recipients of honours are displayed here as they were styled before their new honour, and arranged by honour, with classes (Knight, Knight Grand Cross, etc.) and then divisions (Military, Civil, etc.) as appropriate.

== United Kingdom of Great Britain and Northern Ireland ==
=== Barons ===
- Sir Clive Latham Baillieu, K.B.E., C.M.G., Chairman, Dunlop Rubber Company. For public services.
- The Right Honourable Sir Robert William Hugh O'Neill, Baronet, Member of Parliament for Mid Antrim, 1915–1922, for County Antrim, 1922–1950, and for North Antrim, 1950–1952. Parliamentary Under-Secretary of State for India and Burma, 1939–1940. Member of Parliament of Northern Ireland and first Speaker of the House of Commons of Northern Ireland, 1921–1929. For political and public services.
- The Right Honourable Lord Eustace Sutherland Campbell Percy, Rector, Newcastle Division, University of Durham, 1937–1952. For public services.

=== Privy Counsellors ===
- Lucien Macull Dominic de Silva, Esq., Puisne Justice of the Supreme Court of Ceylon.
- Commander Thomas Dunlop Galbraith, Royal Navy, M.P., Member of Parliament for the Pollok Division of Glasgow since 1940. Joint Parliamentary Under-Secretary of State for Scotland, 1945, and since 1951.

=== Baronets ===
- Marshal of the Royal Air Force Sir Arthur Travers Harris, G.C.B., O.B.E., A.F.C.
- Captain John Helias Finnie McEwen, Member of Parliament for Berwick and Haddington, 1931–1945. Parliamentary Under-Secretary of State for Scotland, 1939–1940; Lord Commissioner of H.M. Treasury, 1942–1944. For political and public services.
- Sir Ernest Henry Pooley, K.C.V.O., Chairman of the Arts Council of Great Britain.

=== Knights Bachelor ===
- John Kenneth Atkinson, Chief Valuer, Board of Inland Revenue.
- His Honour Hugh Loveday Beazley, Common Serjeant of the City of London.
- John Benstead, C.B.E., Deputy Chairman, British Transport Commission.
- Alfred George Ernest Briggs, Deputy Controller of Supplies, Ministry of Supply.
- Herbert Walter Butcher, M.P., Member of Parliament for Holland with Boston since 1937. Lord Commissioner of H.M. Treasury and Government Joint Deputy Chief Whip since 1951.
- Vincent Zachary Cope, M.D., F.R.C.S., Consulting Surgeon, St. Mary's Hospital, London.
- Harold Roxbee Cox, Chief Scientist, Ministry of Fuel and Power.
- Arthur Croft, For political and public services in Bradford.
- James Croysdale, For political and public services in Leeds.
- Matthew Watt Drysdale, Chairman of Lloyds.
- Arthur William Mickle Ellis, O.B.E., D.M., F.R.C.P., Consulting Physician, London Hospital. Emeritus Professor of Medicine, University of Oxford.
- Lincoln Evans, C.B.E., General Secretary, Iron and Steel Trades Confederation.
- Ian Leslie Orr-Ewing, M.P. Member of Parliament for Weston-super-Mare since 1934. For political and public services.
- Walter Fletcher, C.B.E., M.P., Member of Parliament for Bury, 1945–1950, and for Bury and Radcliffe since 1950. For political and public services.
- Henry Dudley Gresham Leveson Gower, Chairman of the Surrey County Cricket Club.
- John Bewley Greaves, C.M.G., O.B.E., Senior Trade Commissioner in the Commonwealth of Australia, Board of Trade.
- Charles Kenneth Felix Hague, Deputy Chairman and Managing Director, Babcock & Wilcox, Ltd. Deputy Chairman, Royal Ordnance Factories Board.
- Professor William Keith Hancock, Chief Civil Historian, Cabinet Office.
- John James Craik Henderson, For political and public services in Scotland.
- Albert Henry Stanley Hinchliffe, For services to the Association of British Chambers of Commerce. Governing Director, Glazebrook, Steel and Company, Ltd.
- William Graham Holford, Professor of Town Planning, University College, London.
- Reuben James Hunt, For political and public services in Essex.
- William Oliphant Hutchison, President, Royal Scottish Academy.
- Harold Jeffreys, Plumian Professor of Astronomy and Experimental Philosophy, University of Cambridge.
- Colonel Robert Godfrey Llewellyn, C.B., C.B.E., M.C., T.D., J.P., D.L. For political and public services in Wales.
- Major Ernest Guy Richard Lloyd, D.S.O., M.P., Member of Parliament for East Renfrew since 1940. For political and public services.
- James Miller, Lord Provost of Edinburgh.
- Frank Percival Montgomery, M.C., M.B. For public services in Northern Ireland.
- James Frederick Mountford, Vice-Chancellor of the University of Liverpool.
- Basil Edward Nicolls, C.V.O., C.B.E., lately Director of Home Broadcasting, and lately Acting Director-General, British Broadcasting Corporation.
- Stanley Colston Parkin, C.B.E., General Manager and Secretary, National Dock Labour Board.
- Stephen Herbert Pierssene, T.D., General Director of the Conservative and Unionist Central Office since 1945. For political services.
- William Henry Pilkington, Chairman, Pilkington Brothers, Ltd. Vice-President, Council of Building Material Producers.
- Clifford Walter Radcliffe, C.B.E., D.L., Clerk of the Middlesex County Council.
- Herbert Read, D.S.O., M.C. For services to literature.
- Dennis Holme Robertson, C.M.G., Professor of Political Economy, University of Cambridge.
- Frank Shires, President, Food Manufacturers' Federation.
- Alderman Thomas Dalrymple Straker-Smith, J.P. For political and public services in Northumberland.
- Harold Sutcliffe, M.P., Member of Parliament for the Royton Division of Lancashire, 1931–1950, and for the Heywood and Royton Division since 1950. For political and public services.
- Arthur Landsborough Thomson, C.B., O.B.E., Second Secretary, Medical Research Council.
- Alderman Denis Henry Truscott, T.D., lately Sheriff of the City of London.
- Major Charles Tuff, J.P., D.L.. For political and public services in Kent.
- Francis Weatherby, M.C., lately Secretary of the Jockey Club.
- Robert Bruce Wycherley, M.C., Managing Director, Abbey National Building Society.

State of Victoria

- Peter MacCallum, M.C., MSc, M.D., a Member of the Medical Board, State of Victoria, and formerly Dean of the Faculty of Medicine at the University of Melbourne.

State of South Australia.

- Edmund Britten Jones, M.B., F.R.C.P., a leading physician in the State of South Australia. For public services.
- Herbert Kingsley Paine, C.M.G., Judge of the Insolvency Court, State of South Australia.

State of Western Australia.

- Joseph Totterdell, Esq., Lord Mayor of the City of Perth. State of Western Australia.

Commonwealth Services.

- Allan Robert Eliott Lockhart, Esq., C.I.E., President, Associated Chambers of Commerce, India; 1951–52.

Colonies, Protectorates, etc.

- Marie Joseph Barnabé Francis Herchenroder, Q.C., Colonial Legal Service, Chief Justice, Mauritius.
- Robert Scott, Esq., C.M.G., Colonial Administrative Service, Administrator, East Africa High Commission.
- Allan Chalmers Smith, M.C., Chief Justice, Sierra Leone.
- Aubrey Kenneth Solomon, C.B.E., Q.C., President of the Legislative Council, Bahamas.
- Eric Crawford Tansley, C.M.G., Managing Director of West African Produce Marketing Companies.

=== Order of the Bath ===
==== Knights Grand Cross (GCB) ====
Military Division

- Admiral Sir John Hereward Edelsten, K.C.B., C.B.E.
- Air Chief Marshal Sir William Forster Dickson, K.C.B., K.B.E., D.S.O., D.F.C., Royal Air Force

Civil Division

- The Right Honourable Sir (James) Ulick Francis Canning Alexander, G.C.V.O., K.C.B., C.M.G., O.B.E., lately Keeper of the Privy Purse and Treasurer to The Queen.
- Sir Ernest Arthur Gowers, G.B.E., K.C.B. For public services.

==== Knights Commander (KCB) ====
Military Division

- Vice-Admiral Charles Edward Lambe, C.B., C.V.O.
- Vice-Admiral (S) William McBride, C.B., C.B.E.
- General Sir Richard Nelson Gale, K.B.E., C.B., D.S.O., M.C. (20116), late Infantry. Colonel, The Worcestershire Regiment.
- General Sir Cameron Gordon Graham Nicholson, K.B.E., C.B., D.S.O., M.C. (13382), late Royal Regiment of Artillery. Colonel Commandant, Royal Regiment of Artillery.
- Air Marshal Sir Basil Edward Embry, K.B.E., C.B., D.S.O., D.F.C., A.F.C., Royal Air Force.

Civil Division

- Sir Geoffrey Stuart King, K.B.E, C.B., M.C., Secretary, Ministry of National Insurance.
- Sir Roger Mellor Makins, K.C.M.G., Deputy Under-Secretary of State, Foreign Office, and Her Majesty's Ambassador Extraordinary and Plenipotentiary, designate, in Washington.
- Thomas Padmore, Esq., C.B., Second Secretary, H.M. Treasury.

==== Companions (CB) ====
Military Division

- Rear-Admiral Sir Anthony Wass Buzzard, Bt., D.S.O., O.B.E.
- Rear-Admiral John Wilson Cuthbert, C.B.E.
- Surgeon Rear-Admiral Thomas Norman D'Arcy, C.B.E., L.R.C.P. & S., D.O.M.S.
- Rear-Admiral (E) Frank Trowbridge Mason.
- Rear-Admiral William Geoffrey Arthur Robson, D.S.O., D.S.C.
- Instructor Captain Harry Victor Rumsey, M.M., Royal Navy.
- Rear-Admiral Arthur David Torlesse, D.S.O.
- Rear-Admiral Robert Spencer Warne, C.B.E.
- Major-General Kennett Bayley, C.B.E. (30972), late Infantry.
- Major-General Arthur Joseph Beveridge, O.B.E., M.C., M.B., Q.H.P. (8619), late Royal Army Medical Corps.
- Major-General Basil Aubrey Coad, C.B.E. D.S.O. (34667), late Infantry.
- Major-General Sidney Arthur Cooke, O.B.E. (28103), late Infantry.
- Major-General Launcelot Eric Cutforth, C.B.E. (641), Royal Army Ordnance Corps.
- Brigadier Leonard Frank Field, C.B.E. (13695), late Royal Army Service Corps.
- Major-General Richard Wakefield Goodbody, D.S.O. (26967), late Royal Regiment of Artillery.
- Major-General William Edward Gordon Hemming, C.B.E. (4530), late Royal Regiment of Artillery.
- Major-General Lancelot Edgar Connop Mervyn Perowne, C.B.E. (23654), late Corps of Royal Engineers.
- Major-General John Christopher Walkey, C.B.E. (27009), late Corps of Royal Engineers.
- Major-General Mervyn Savile Wheatley, C.B.E. (222), late Royal Corps of Signals.
- Major-General John Harold Owen Wilsey, C.B.E., D.S.O. (30965), late Infantry.
- Major-General (temporary) Harold Williams, C.B.E. (11947), late Corps of Royal Engineers, at present on loan to the Government of India as Engineer-in-Chief, Indian Army.
- Air Vice Marshal Edward Demetrius Dalziel Dickson, C.B.E., F.R.C.S. (E), M.D., Q.H.S., Royal Air Force.
- Acting Air Vice-Marshal Edward Crisp Farman, C.B.E., Royal Air Force.
- Acting Air Vice-Marshal Henry Paterson Fraser, C.B.E., A.F.C, Royal Air Force.
- Air Commodore William Joseph Grisham, C.B.E., Royal Air Force.
- Air Commodore Jack Harris Harris, C.B.E., Royal Air Force Regiment.
- Air Commodore Wallace Hart Kyle, C.B.E., D.S.O., D.F.C. A.D.C., Royal Air Force.

Civil Division

- John Buckingham, Esq., Director of Research Programmes and Planning, Royal Naval Scientific Service, Admiralty.
- Archibald William Major Bull, Esq., Clerk of the Journals, House of Commons.
- John Eric Bullard, Esq., Under-Secretary, National Assistance Board.
- Wilfred Harry Curtis, Esq., C.B.E., Assistant Under-Secretary of State, War Office.
- Frederick Laurence Edwards, Esq., O.B.E., Accountant General, Ministry of Housing and Local Government.
- John Saye Wingfield Twistleton-Wykeham-Fiennes, Esq., Parliamentary Counsel.
- William Henry Glanville, Esq., C.B.E., Director, Road Research Laboratory, Department of Scientific and Industrial Research.
- Frank Grant, Esq., O.B.E., Under-Secretary, Ministry of Agriculture and Fisheries.
- Victor Percy Harries, Esq., Under-Seeretary, Ministry of Supply.
- William Hughes, Esq., Under-Secretary, Board of Trade.
- Guy Maynard Liddell, Esq., C.B.E., M.C., War Office.
- Gwilym Ivor Morris, Esq., Under-Secretary, Ministry of Transport.
- John Hubert Penson, Esq., C.M.G., M.C., Under-Secretary, H.M. Treasury Attache at H.M. Embassy in Washington, Ministry of Materials.
- Herbert John Shelley, Esq., O.B.E., Chief Inspector, Ministry of Education.
- Rupert Leigh Sich, Esq. Principal Assistant Solicitor, Treasury Solicitor's Branch, Ministry of Fuel and Power.
- Robert Spence, Esq., Chief Chemist, Atomic Energy Research Establishment, Harwell, Ministry of Supply.
- Arthur Wood Taylor, Esq., Commissioner, Board of Customs and Excise.
- Brigadier George Hands Walton, C.B.E., T.D., D.L., Chairman, Territorial and Auxiliary Forces Association, County of Durham.
- Arnold Sydney Whitehead, Esq., C.B.E., Secretary, Board of Inland Revenue.

=== Order of Merit ===
- Wilder Graves Penfield, Esq., C.M.G., M.D.

=== Order of St Michael and St George ===
==== Knights Grand Cross (GCMG) ====
- Sir Ivone Augustine Kirkpatrick, K.C.B., K.C.M.G., United Kingdom High Commissioner in Germany.
- Sir Edward Francis Twining, K.C.M.G., M.B.E., Governor and Commander-in-Chief, Tanganyika.

==== Knights Commander (KCMG) ====
- Major General John Alexander Sinclair, C.B., O.B.E.; late Royal Regiment of Artillery. For official services.
- Donald Charles MacGillivray, Esq., C.M.G., M.B.E., Deputy High Commissioner, Federation of Malaya.
- John Fearns Nicoll, Esq., C.M.G., Governor and Commander-in-Chief, Singapore.
- Eric Denholm Pridie, Esq., C.M.G., D.S.O., O.B.E., M.B., B.S., Chief Medical Officer, Colonial Office.
- Edwin Arthur Chapman-Andrews, Esq., C.M.G., O.B.E., Her Majesty's Ambassador Extraordinary and Plenipotentiary at Beirut.
- Hubert Ashton Graves, Esq., C.M.G., M.C., Her Majesty's Envoy Extraordinary and Minister Plenipotentiary at Saigon.
- Lionel Henry Lamb, Esq., C.M.G., O.B.E., Chargé d'Affaires ad interim at Her Majesty's Embassy in Peking.
- Hugh Ellis-Rees, Esq., C.B., C.M.G., Permanent United Kingdom Representative on the Organisation for European Economic Cooperation at Paris.

==== Companions (CMG) ====
- Harry Gibson Curran, Esq., H.M.. Treasury Representative in South Asia.
- John Robert Lloyd Davies, Esq., Assistant Secretary, Ministry of Labour and National Service.
- Edward Abdy Fellowes, Esq., C.B., M.C., Clerk-Assistant, House of Commons. For services to Commonwealth Parliaments and Legislatures.
- Edward Reginald Greene, Esq., lately Director of the Coffee Division, Ministry of Food.
- Howard George Charles Mallaby, Esq., O.B.E., Under-Secretary, Cabinet Office.
- Herbert Somerville Smith, Esq., D.S.O., O.B.E., M.C., Comptroller-General, Export Credits Guarantee Department.
- William Cleveland Cleveland-Stevens, Esq., Q.C., J.P., Director, Council of Legal Education.
- Norman Edgar Costar, Esq., an Assistant Secretary in the Commonwealth Relations Office.
- The Honourable Patrick Bisset Fletcher, Minister of Native Affairs and Minister of Health, Southern Rhodesia.
- Torleiv Hytten, Esq., Vice-Chancellor of the University of the State of Tasmania.
- Alfred Edward Rowden White, Esq., M.D., F.R.A.C.P., a prominent physician in the State of Victoria. For public and philanthropic services.
- Cyril Grove Costley-White, Esq., an Assistant Secretary in the Commonwealth Relations Office.
- Robert Brown Black, Esq., O.B.E., Colonial Administrative Service, Colonial Secretary, Hong Kong.
- Wilfred Lawson Blythe, Esq., Colonial Administrative Service, Colonial Secretary, Singapore.
- Richard William Foxlee, Esq., C.B.E., Engineer-in-Chief, Office of the Crown Agents for the Colonies.
- Leslie Herbert Goble, Esq., Colonial Administrative Service, Administrative Secretary, Nigeria.
- Caryll Archibald Grossmith, Esq., O.B.E., Administrative Secretary to the Comptroller for Development and Welfare, West Indies.
- Gordon Hadow, Esq.,. O.B.E., Colonial Administrative Service, Secretary to the Governor and Secretary to the Executive Council, Gold Coast.
- Michael Joseph Patrick Hogan, Esq., Q.C., Colonial Legal Service, Attorney-General, Federation of Malaya.
- Evelyn Dennispn Hone, Esq., O.B.E., Colonial Administrative Service, Colonial Secretary, British Honduras.
- Francis Joseph Lattin, Esq., Colonial Administrative Service, Development Commissioner, Uganda.
- Allan Ronald Macdonald, Esq., Colonial Administrative Service, Colonial Secretary, Sierra Leone.
- Algar Ronald Ward Robertson, Esq., C.B.E., Colonial Administrative Service, Financial Secretary, Trinidad and Tobago.
- Colin Hardwick Thornley, Esq., Colonial Administrative Service, Chief Secretary, Uganda.
- Richard Gordon Turnbull, Esq., Colonial Administrative Service, Provincial Commissioner, Kenya.
- Thomas Broadwood Williamson, Esq., Assistant Secretary, Colonial Office.
- Rajah Idris ibni Almarhum Sultan Iskander Shah, Raja Muda, Perak, Federation of Malaya. (Honorary)
- Samuel Layinka Ayodeji Manuwa, O.B.E., M.D., Ch.B., Inspector-General of Medical Services, Nigeria.(Honorary)
- Ja'Afaru Emir of Zaria, C.B.E., Nigeria.(Honorary)
- Maurice Edward Bathurst, Esq., C.B.E., Legal Adviser to the United Kingdom High Commissioner in Germany.
- Nicolas John Alexander Cheetham, Esq., Head of the Western and Southern Department, Foreign Office.
- Arthur Noel Cumberbatch, Esq., C.B.E., Minister (Commercial) at Her Majesty's Embassy in Cairo.
- Thomas William Deeves, Esq., C.B.E., M.C., Assistant Secretary, Foreign Office Administration of African Territories.
- George D'Arcy Edmondson, Esq., O.B.E., Controller, British Information Services, New York.
- Cyril Ogden Wakefield-Harrey, Esq., lately Her Majesty's Consul-General at Strasbourg. Now at Algiers.
- Samuel, Viscount Hood, Head of the Western Organisations Department, Foreign Office.
- Con Douglas Walter O'Neill, Esq., Counsellor, Office of the United Kingdom High Commissioner, Wahnerheide.
- Ernest James Passant, Esq., Director of Research and Librarian and Keeper of the Papers of the Foreign Office.
- Captain Frank Alexander Slocum, O.B.E., R.N. (Retired), Foreign Office.
- Roger Cuthbert Wakefield, Esq., O.B.E., Director of Surveys, Sudan Government.
- John William Wall, Esq., Political Agent, Bahrain, Persian Gulf.

=== Royal Victorian Order ===
==== Dame Grand Cross (GCVO) ====
- The Right Honourable Rose Constance, Countess Granville, D.C.V.O.

==== Knights Commanders (KCVO) ====
- Sir Leslie Cecil Blackmore Bowker, O.B.E., M.C.
- Thomas Chadwick, C.V.O., C.B.E.
- The Honourable Harold George Nicolson, C.M.G.
- Brigadier the Right Honourable Charles George Vivian, Baron Tryon, D.S.O.

==== Commanders (CVO) ====
- Alan Philip Hay, Esq.
- James Harold Macdonald, Esq., T.D., W.S.
- Colonel Frederick Ferris Bligh St. George, The Life Guards.
- Sydney William Smart, Esq., O.B.E.
- Robert Somerville, Esq.

==== Fourth Class ====
- Major Andrew William Haig.
- Roy Frederick Lloyd, Esq.
- Miss Rosina Mary Mclennan, M.V.O.
- Lieutenant-Commander John Michael Avison Parker, Royal Navy (Retired).
- Reginald Charles Bennett Rady, Esq.

==== Fifth Class ====
- Charles George Robert Warner, Esq.

=== Order of the British Empire ===
==== Knights Grand Cross (GBE) ====
Military Division

- Admiral Sir Cecil Halliday Jepson Harcourt, K.C.B., C.B.E.

Civil Division

- Lieutenant-Colonel The Right Honourable John Theodore Cuthbert, Baron Brabazon of Tara, M.C. For services to Civil Aviation.
- The Right Honourable Edmund Colquhoun, Earl of Limerick, K.C.B., D.S.O., T.D., Chairman of the Council of the Territorial and Auxiliary Forces Association.
- Sir Charles Campbell Woolley, K.C.M.G., O.B.E., M.C, Governor and Commander-in-Chief, British Guiana.
- Sir Alvary Douglas Frederick Gascoigne, K.C.M.G., Her Majesty's Ambassador Extraordinary and Plenipotentiary in Moscow.

==== Dames Commander (DBE) ====
Civil Division

- Miss Elisabeth Hariott Kelly, C.B.E., J.P. For public and charitable services in Portsmouth and district.

==== Knights Commander (KBE) ====
Military Division

- Surgeon Vice-Admiral Kenneth Alexander Ingleby-Mackenzie, C.B., B.M., B.Ch..
- Vice-Admiral Cecil Aubrey Lawson Mansergh, C.B., D.S.C.
- Lieutenant-General Ernest Edward Down, C.B., C.B.E. (23809), late Infantry.
- Lieutenant-General Frederick Harris, C.B..C.B.E., M.C, M.B., Q.H.S. (15707), late Royal Army Medical Corps.
- Lieutenant-General Alfred Dudley Ward, C.B., C.B.E., D.S.O. (41238), late Infantry Colonel, The King's Regiment (Liverpool).
- Acting Air Marshal Alfred Clifford Sanderson, C.B., C.B.E., D.F.C., Royal Air Force.
- Air Vice-Marshal Cecil Arthur Bouchier, C.B., C.B.E., D.F.C., Royal Air Force.
- Air Vice-Marshal Dermot Alexander Boyle, C.B., C.B.E., A.F.C., Royal Air Force.

Civil Division

- Lieutenant-Colonel Edward Hoblyn Warren Bolitho, C.B., D.S.O., H.M. Lieutenant for the County of Cornwall. Lately Chairman, Cornwall County Council.
- George Herbert Fretwell, C.B., Director General of Works, Air Ministry.
- Sir Robert Macdonald Gould, C.B., Chief Industrial Commissioner, Ministry of Labour and National Service.
- Arthur Sydney Hutchinson, Esq., C.B., C.V.O., Deputy Under-Secretary of State, Home Office.
- Sir Patrick Ramsay Laird, C.B., Secretary, Department of Agriculture for Scotland.
- Henry Victor Alpin MacKinnon Raikes, Esq., M.P., Member of Parliament for South-East Essex, 1931–1945; for Wavertree Division of Liverpool, 1945–1950; and for Garston Division of Liverpool since 1950. For political and public services.
- Colonel Harold Charles Smith, C.B.E., Chairman of the Gas Council.
- Seiyid Bubakr, C.B.E., bin Sheikh Al Kaf, State Councillor of the Kathiri State, Eastern Aden Protectorate.
- Bryan Evers Sharwood-Smith, C.M.G., E.D., Lieutenant-Governor, Northern Region, Nigeria.
- Sheikh Said, C.B.E. bin All el-Mugheiri, Senior Unofficial Member of the Legislative Council, Zanzibar. (Honorary)
- The Honourable Duncan Ross McLarty, M.M., Premier of the State of Western Australia.
- Duncan Cameron Cumming, Esq., C.B., C.B.E., lately Chief Administrator in Eritrea.
- Robert Henry Hadow, Esq., C.M.G., M.C., Her Majesty's Consul-General at Los Angeles.

==== Commanders (CBE) ====
Military Division

- Rear-Admiral (E) Frederick Stewart Billings.
- Captain George Cecil Colville, O.B.E., Royal Navy.
- Captain William Patrick McCarthy, Royal Navy (Retired).
- Major-General Cecil Farndale Phillips, D.S.O., O.B.E., Royal Marines.
- Captain Charles Bettesworth Sanders, V.R.D., R.N.V.R.
- Acting Captain (S) Godfrey Benjamin Teale, O.B.E., Royal Navy.
- Captain (L) Ronald Cunningham Wield, Royal Navy.
- The Reverend Francis Pirie Wilson Alexander, O.B.E., Q.H.C., Chaplain to the Forces, First Class (33605), Royal Army Chaplains' Department
- Colonel (temporary) George Sinclair Cole, O.B.E. (52577), Royal Regiment of Artillery.
- Brigadier George Hew Fanshawe, O.B.E. (13054), late Royal Armoured Corps.
- Colonel (temporary) Hamish William Forsyth (47567), The Royal Scots (The Royal Regiment).
- Brigadier Barnard Alfred Goldstein, O.B.E. (5924), Royal Army Ordnance Corps.
- Colonel (acting) John Cecil King (344475), Army Cadet Force.
- Colonel Mary Railton (192959), Women's Royal Army Corps.
- Brigadier Murray Farquharson Farquharson-Roberts (10650), late Royal Army Service Corps.
- Brigadier (temporary) Richard Henry Littleton Wheeler. O.B.E. (34344), late Royal Regiment of Artillery.
- Brigadier Ralph Everard Bagnall-Wild, O.B.E. (14515), late Corps of Royal : Engineers.
- Brigadier (temporary) John Christopher Temple Willis, O.B.E. (19240), late Corps of Royal Engineers.
- Major-General John Wren (5532), late Royal Army Dental Corps.
- Air Vice-Marshal Alfred Charles Henry Sharp, D.S.O., A.F.C., Royal Air Force.
- Air Commodore Frederick George Stewart Mitchell, O.B.E., Royal Air Force.
- Group Captain Ord Denny Allerton, O.B.E., Royal Air Force.
- Group Captain Oliver Russell Donaldson, D.S.O., O.B.E:, D.F.C., Royal Air Force.
- Group Captain Richard James Alexander Ford, Royal Air Force.
- Group Captain Fergus Alexander Pearce, O.B.E., Royal Air Force.
- Group Captain Joseph Herbert McCarthy Reynolds, Royal Air Force.
- Group Captain Roy Scoggins, L.D.S., Q.H.D.S., Royal Air Force.
- Group Captain John Andrews Tester, O.B.E., Royal Air Force.
- Group Captain John Newall Tomes, Royal Air Force.
- Group Captain Frank Darker Tredrey, O.B.E., Royal Air Force (Retired).

Civil Division

- Ove Nyquist Arup, Esq., Architectural Engineer.
- Hume Babington, Esq. For political services in Londonderry.
- Captain Kenelm Joseph Godfrey Bartlett, Deputy Chairman, European Purchasing Commission, Ministry of Supply.
- Group Captain Robert John Ferguson Barton, O.B.E., R.A.F. (Retired), Lately Managing Director, Air Service Training, Ltd., Hamble.
- Edwyn Ernest Hope Bate, Esq., M.B.E., M.C., Chief Works Engineer, Ministry of Works.
- Alderman William Bird, M.B.E., J.P., Mayor of St. Albans. Chairman, Colne Valley Sewerage Board.
- Miss Margaret Joyce Bishop, Headmistress, Godolphin and Latymer School, Hammersmith.
- Maurice Bantock Blackshaw, Esq., Superintending Architect for Housing, Ministry of Housing and Local Government.
- Wilfred Barrett Bradshaw, Esq., Director of Accounts and Audit, Ministry of Labour and National Service.
- Frank Edward Brown, Esq., Deputy Comptroller and Accountant-General, General Post Office.
- Colonel Maurice Brpwne, M.C., J.P., D.L. For services .to the Middlesex Regiment.
- Frederick Jonathan Bywater, Esq., M.C, Chairman, The Council for Codes of Practice for Buildings, Construction and Engineering Services.
- Robert Black Carnegie, Esq., O.B.E., County Surveyor. Devon County Council.
- Herbert Franklin Carpenter, Esq. For services as Secretary, British Electricity Authority.
- Walter Cawood Esq., Deputy Director, Royal Aircraft Establishment, Ministry of Supply.
- Lieutenant-Colonel John Clervaux Chaytor, D.S.O., M.C., Chief Constable, North Riding Constabulary.
- David Christy, Esq., Provincial Land Commissioner, Ministry of Agriculture and Fisheries.
- Clarence Thomas Church, Esq., Assistant Secretary, Ministry of Pensions.
- Herbert Arthur Cruse, Esq., Director and General Works Manager, Westinghouse Brake and Signal Company Ltd.
- Albert Ernest Dale, Esq., M.B.E., Assistant Secretary, Ministry of Health.
- Charles Eustace Davies, Esq., Director, Harvey, Bradfield and Toyer, Ltd. Ghaiiman, London Area Provisions and Groceries Committee.
- George Rowland Davies, Esq., J.P., Chairman, Radnorshire Agricultural Executive Committee.
- Ivor Jones Davies, Esq., M.D., F.R.C.P., Consulting Physician to the Ministry of Pensions Hospital at Rookwood, Cardiff.
- Arthur Keller-Davis, Esq., M.C., Assistant Secretary, Ministry of Supply.
- Bonner William Arthur Dickson, Esq., lately Director and General Manager, Vickers-Armstrongs, Ltd. (Aircraft Section).
- Marryat Ross Dobie, Esq., Librarian, National Library of Scotland.
- Thomas Elwood, Esq., Director of Establishments, Ministry of Finance, Northern Ireland.
- Miss Kathleen Mary Ferrier, Singer.
- Noel Lindsay, Mrs. Fielden, M.B.E. For political and public services in Shropshire.
- George Beaumont Fielding, Esq., Director, Cotton Spinners' and Manufacturers' Association.
- John Eathorne Foden, Esq., O.B.E., Special Director for Security, Allied Military Government, British Element, Trieste.
- Alexander Strathern Fulton, Esq., Keeper of Oriental Printed Books and Manuscripts, British Museum.
- Miss Frances Gowlland Goodall, O.B.E., General Secretary, Royal College of Nursing.
- Reginald Scott Habbdam, Esq., Senior Principal Inspector of Taxes, Board of Inland Revenue.
- Cyril Henry Haines, Esq., M.B.E., Head of Claims Department, Foreign Office.
- William Marshall Hargreaves, Esq., Director of Navigational Services (Aerodromes), Ministry of Civil Aviation.
- Frank Henry Harrod, Esq., M.C., Secretary, Committee for the Education of Poles in Great Britain.
- Thomas Haworth, Esq., Chief Accountant, Port of London Authority.
- Commander Sydney Peck Herivel, O.B.E., D.S.C., Royal Navy (Retired), President of the States of Alderney.
- George Gordon Honeyman, Esq., Chairman, Civil Service Arbitration Tribunal.
- Harry Raper Humphries, Esq., O.B.E., Director, Animal Feeding Stuffs Division, Ministry of Food.
- Montagu Vaughan Castelman Jeffreys, Esq., Professor of Education, University of Birmingham.
- John Reeder Makeig-Jones, Esq. For political and public services in Devon.
- Norman Samuel Joseph, Esq., Director of J. Lyons and Company, Ltd. For services to the Home Office.
- Captain George Stewart Kennedy, Marine Superintendent, Orient Steam Navigation Company.
- Myles Noel Kenyon, Esq., D.L. For political and public services in Lancashire.
- Anthony Highamore King, Esq., Master of the Crown Office and Registrar of the Court of Criminal Appeal..
- Joshua Kenneth Knowles, Esq., General Secretary, National Farmers' Union.
- Thomas Lamas Lees, Esq. Deputy Timber Controller, Ministry of Materials.
- Lieutenant-Colonel Henry Morton Llewellyn, O.B.E., D.L. For services to British International Show Jumping.
- Donald Neil McArthur, Esq., Director, Macaulay Institute for Soil Research, Aberdeen.
- Alexander Macbeath, Esq., Professor of Logic and Metaphysics, Queen's University, Belfast.
- Professor Robert Alexander McCance, M.D., F.R.C.P., Director, Department of Experimental Medicine, Medical Research Council and University of Cambridge.
- James Macdonald, Esq., Director of Research and Education, Forestry Commission.
- John Nelson McMillen, Esq., lately Chairman, Northern Ireland Tourist Board.
- Wyndham D'Arcy Madden, Esq., J.P., Chairman, North-Western Regional Board for Industry.
- Albert James Manson, Esq., M.B.E., Assistant Secretary, Ministry of Supply.
- The Most Noble Alexandra Mary Beatrice, Duchess of Marlborough, Member of the Council and of the Executive Committee of the British Red Cross Society.
- Bernard Miles, Esq., Producer and Actor.
- Alderman John William Moore. For political and public services in Bournemouth.
- Rodrigo Moynihan, Esq., A.R.A., Professor of Painting at the Royal College of Art.
- Ashley Myott, Esq., Chairman and Managing Director, Myott Son and Company, Ltd.
- Louis Boyd Neel, Esq., Conductor.
- Edward Moreland Parsey, Esq., Assistant Solicitor, Board of Trade.
- Payne Harry Pettiford, Esq., O.B.E., Superintendent, Operative Department, Royal Mint.
- Harry Plowman, Esq., Town Clerk, Oxford.
- William Harold Plumer, Esq., Assistant Secretary, Central Land Board and War Damage Commission.
- Harold James Poole, Esq., Chief Superintendent, Armament Research Establishment, Ministry of Supply.
- Marcus Jay Posener, Esq., Deputy Accountant-General, Ministry of Education.
- Harold Haldane Calder Prestige, Esq., Assistant Secretary, Home Office.
- Leonard Pughe, Esq., Assistant Secretary, Admiralty.
- Alfred Mordey Rake, Esq., Assistant Secretary, Ministry of Fuel and Power.
- Arthur Ransome, Esq., Writer.
- Frederick Ivor Ray, Esq., Regional. Director, London Telecommunications Region, General Post Office.
- Alfred Read, Esq., M.B.E., Director and Secretary, Powell Duffryn, Ltd.
- Irene Helen, Mrs. Reid, M.B.E., J.P. For political and public services in the North-East.
- Godfrey Robinson, Esq., M.C, Chairman, National Institute for the Blind.
- Colin. Marshall Skinner, Esq., Chairman, Board of Governors, United Manchester Hospitals.
- John Arthur Smale, Esq., A.F.C., Engineer-in-Chief, Cable & Wireless
- Norman Smith, Esq., Assistant Secretary, Ministry of Fuel and Power.
- Charles Archibald Philip Southwell, Esq., M.C., Managing Directory Kuwait Oil Company, Ltd.
- Frederick Varty Spark, Esq., Chief Accountant, Secretary and Director, Harland and Wolff, Ltd., Belfast.
- Alan Reynolds Stone, Esq., Engraver and designer.
- Major Andrew Theodore Sumner, M.C, Commissioner, Civil Service Commission.
- Charles Lindsay Sutherland, Esq., O.B.E., M.D..; Senior Medical Officer, Ministry of National Insurance.
- Arthur Henry Topham, Esq., Joint Managing Director, Mawdsley's Ltd., Dursley, Gloucestershire.
- Frederic Gordon Tucker Esq., O.B.E., T.D., Chairman, Licensing Authority, South Eastern Traffic Area, Ministry of Transport.
- George Tucker, Esq., Assistant Secretary, Air Ministry.
- Alexander TUurnbull, Esq., M.B.E., Vice-Chairman of the Governors, Royal Technical College, Glasgow.
- Charles John Turner, Esq., Chief Engineer, Division of Atomic Energy (Production), Risley, Ministry of Supply.
- Leonard Charles Tyte, Esq., Deputy Chief Scientific Officer, Fort Halstead, Ministry of Supply.
- Arnold Learoyd Walker, Esq., M.B., F.R.C.S., Chairman, Central Midwives Board.
- Henry Richard Watling, Esq., O.B.E., J.P., Director, British Cycle and Motor Cycle Manufacturers and Traders Union, Ltd., Coventry.
- Thomas Frederick Watson, Esq., M.C., D.C.M. For political services.
- Robert Weaver, Esq., M.D.,. L.R.C.P., Senior Medical Officer, Ministry of Education.
- Samuel Arthur Henry Whetmore, Esq., lately Joint Managing Director, Billingham Division, Imperial Chemical Industries, Ltd.
- John Letham White, Esq., D.L. For.political and public, services in Scotland.
- Henry Albert Wilkinson, Esq., M.G., Assistant Secretary, Board of Trade.
- Gwilym Ffrangcon Williams, Esq., O:B.E., Vice-Chairman, National Savings Committee.
- Alderman William Emyr-Williams, Chairman of the Executive Committee of the Council of the National Eisteddfod of Wales.
- James Williamson, Esq., Senior Partner, James Williamson and Partners, Glasgow
- Commander William John Adlam Willis, M.V.O., O.B.E., C.G:M, D.L., Royal Navy (Retired), Chief Constable of Bedfordshire.
- The Right Reverend Henry Albert Wilson, Chairman, Dagenham Local Employment Committee.
- Thomas James Winnall, Esq., Director of Navy Accounts, Admiralty.
- Miss Diana Wynyard (Mrs. Tibor Csato), Actress.
- Thomas Young, Esq., O.B.E., Legal Adviser in Scotland to the Ministry of Pensions. Chairman, Legal Aid Central Committee for Scotland.
- Captain Henry Creni Curmi, O.B.E., lately Commissioner for Malta in Australia.
- Leo D'Almada e Castro, Esq., Q.C. For public services in Hong Kong.
- Frank Pownall Egerton, Esq.; Deputy Chairman and General Manager of the Central Electricity Board, Federation of Malaya.
- George Birt Evelyn, Esq. For public services in Barbados.
- The Right Reverend Richard Joseph Fitzgerald, Roman Catholic Bishop of Gibraltar.
- Francis Goodwin Gosling, Esq., O.B.E. For public services in Bermuda.
- Gerald George Sydney James Hadlow, Esq., O.B.E. For public services in Nyasaland.
- Gilbert Howe, Esq., Colonial Administrative Service, Provincial Commissioner, Northern Rhodesia.
- John Lowe, Esq., M.D., Senior Specialist (Leprologist), Nigeria.
- James Mitchell, Esq. For public services in North Borneo.
- Alan Allcock Oldaker, Esq., Colonial Administrative Service, Senior Provincial Commissioner, Tanganyika.
- Major Harry Barren Sharpe. For public services in Kenya.
- Vivian Fox-Strangways, Esq., Colonial Administrative Service, Secretary for African Affairs, Nyasaland.
- Charles Thornton, Esq. For public services in the Federation of Malaya.
- Sultan Saleh bin Husein Al Audhali, Sultan of the Audhali State, Western Aden Protectorate. (Honorary)
- The Honourable William James Beckett, a Member of the Legislative Council, State of Victoria, 1914–52.
- Percy Gordon Bice, Esq., V.D., Chief Storekeeper and Executive Officer, Supply and Tender Board, State of South Australia.
- Frank Edward Hough, Esq., O.B.E., Chief Mechanical Engineer, Rhodesia Railways.
- Thomas Chambers Windsor Ror, Esq., O.B.E., Chairman of the Council, East India Charitable Trust.
- James Alexander Campbell-Wilson, Esq., President of the Dental Board, State of Western Australia.
- Randle Reid-Adam, Esq., O.B.E., lately Deputy Consul-General (Commercial) at New York. Now at Cologne.
- Howard Tulloch Bennett, Esq., O.B.E., Managing Director, Marconi Telegraph Company of Egypt.
- William Mitchell Carse, Esq., Her Majesty's Consul-General at São Paulo.
- Brian Kennedy-Cooke, Esq., M.C., British Council Representative in Italy.
- Laurence Vickerman Kietley-Duff, Esq., lately General Manager in Bolivia of the Antofagasta-Bolivia Railway.
- Brigadier William Laurence Gibson, M.B.E. (Retired), lately Land Commissioner, Land Niedersachsen, Control Commission for Germany (British Element).
- Herbert Reginald Dauphin Gybbon-Monypenny, Esq., O.B.E., Her Majesty's Consul-General at Jerusalem.
- The Right Reverend William Jameson Thompson, Bishop of the Church of England in Persia.

==== Officers (OBE) ====
Military Division

- Commander John William Francis Douglas Cowgill, Royal Navy.
- The Reverend Cyril Damian Fay, Chaplain, Royal Navy.
- Commander (E) Peter Kenneth Llewellyn Fry, Royal Navy.
- Lieutenant-Colonel Frank Cyril Horton, Royal Marines.
- Commander John Richard Jarvis, M.B.E., Royal Navy (Retired).
- Commander Richard Frederick Jessel, D.S.O., D.S.C., Royal Navy (Retired).
- Mr. Alexander Bain McIntyre, R.D., Chief Engineer Officer, R.F.A. Service.
- Commander John Stanley Milner, Royal Navy.
- Surgeon Commander (D) William Leonard Mountain, L.D.S., Royal Navy.
- Lieutenant-Commander George William Robert Nicholl, Royal Navy (Retired).
- Commander (S) Frank Langford Whitehouse, Royal Navy.
- Major Graham Charles Lambert Alexander, T.D. (66413), Corps of Royal Engineers.
- Lieutenant-Colonel Eric Wilfrid John Bence, M.C. (123459), Royal Regiment of Artillery, Territorial Army.
- Lieutenant-Colonel Richard Dawnay Martin Bird, T.D. (87008), The Manchester Regiment, Territorial Army.
- Lieutenant-Colonel Morris Sutherland Worgan Bisdee (58237), Royal Army Medical Corps.
- Lieutenant-Colonel Philip Henry Akerman Brownrigg, D.S.O., T.D. (87962), The Royal Berkshire Regiment (Princess Charlotte of Wales's), Territorial Army.
- Lieutenant-Colonel Walter Arthur George Burns, D.S.O., M.C. (50398), Coldstream Guards.
- Lieutenant-Colonel Noel Lindsay Cariss, T.D. (32378), Royal Regiment of Artillery, Territorial Army.
- Major Richard Oswald Hobart Carver (62678), Corps of Royal Engineers.
- Lieutenant-Colonel Alexander Henry Richard Chalmers, M.C., T.D. (92173), The Gloucestershire.Regiment, Territorial Army.
- Lieutenant-Colonel (Temporary) Anthony Hunter Dangerfield (52444), The Royal Warwickshire Regiment.
- Lieutenant-Colonel Alfred William Compton Glossop, T.D. (52390), Royal Regiment of Artillery, Territorial Army.
- Lieutenant-Colonel (Staff Quartermaster) Daniel Grafton (72037), Extra Regimentally Employed List.
- Lieutenant-Colonel (Temporary) Arthur Thurston Hatfield (282402), Royal Army Ordnance Corps.
- Lieutenant-Colonel Stephen Muir Hollway, M.C., T.D. (52080), Corps of Royal Engineers, Territorial Army.
- Lieutenant-Colonel (Acting) George Edwin Holmes (290764), Army Cadet Force.
- Lieutenant-Colonel William Horsfall (113288), Royal Army Service Corps.
- Lieutenant-Colonel (Temporary) Percival de Courcy Jones (56715), The King's Shropshire Light Infantry.
- Major Lionel Arthur Liddell, T.D. (19798), Royal Regiment of Artillery.
- Lieutenant-Colonel (Temporary) Frederick Stephen Ronald Mackenzie (52691), Royal Tank Regiment, Royal Armoured Corps.
- Lieutenant-Colonel (Temporary) James Mahoney, M.C. (159368), The Cameronians (Scottish Rifles).
- Lieutenant-Colonel (Staff Quartermaster) John Middleton (56354), Extra Regimentally Employed List.
- Lieutenant-Colonel Arthur Miskin (211037), Corps of Royal Electrical and Mechanical Engineers.
- Lieutenant-Colonel (Temporary) Richard John Hardinge Harding-Newman (49859), Royal Regiment of Artillery.
- Lieutenant-Colonel (Quartermaster) Harold Hunter Parsons (75959), Extra Regimentally Employed List.
- Lieutenant-Colonel (Ordnance Executive Officer) William Albert Paston (86338), Royal Army Ordnance Corps.
- Lieutenant-Colonel (Temporary) Herbert John Pitman (221500), Royal Army Service Corps.
- Lieutenant-Colonel (Acting) Mark Harold Raymond, T.D, (33227), Combined Cadet Force.
- Lieutenant-Colonel Frank Ellis Robertson (12638), Royal Regiment of Artillery.
- Lieutenant-Colonel (Staff Quartermaster) Albert George Ruler (70170), Extra Regimentally Employed List.
- Lieutenant-Colonel (Temporary) Alan Patrick Smith (62543), Corps of Royal Engineers.
- Lieutenant-Colonel Vera Kathleen Stead, T.D. (192521), Women's Royal Army Corps Territorial Army.
- Lieutenant-Colonel James Albert Thorlby (63346), Corps of Royal Engineers.
- Lieutenant-Colonel Walter John Cambridge Todd, T.D. (49507), Royal Regiment of Artillery, Territorial Army.
- Lieutenant-Colonel (Temporary) John Edward Francis Willoughby (58173), The Middlesex Regiment (Duke of Cambridge's Own).
- Lieutenant-Colonel James Sykes-Wright, D.S.O. (41221), The Queen's Royal Regiment (West Surrey).
- Acting Group Captain Edward John George, Royal Air Force.
- The Reverend Thomas Madoc Jones, B.A., Royal Air Force.
- Wing Commander Donald Moore Harrison Craven, D.F.C. (36048), Royal Air Force.
- Wing Commander Hugh Anthony Shipley Disney (72106), Royal Air Force.
- Wing Commander Kenneth John McDonald, D.F.C. (39097), Royal Air Force.
- Wing Commander Arthur Bookey Riall (59972), Royal Air Force Regiment.
- Wing Commander Leonard Charles John Smith (76927), Royal Air Force.
- Acting Wing Commander David Beatty Fitzpatrick, A.F.C. (40525), Royal Air Force.
- Acting Wing Commander Philip Louis (46201), Royal Air Force.
- Acting Wing Commander Charles Lockwood Turnbull (63274), Royal Air Force Volunteer Reserve.
- Squadron Leader Norman Percy Wilson Conquer (106535), Royal Air Force.
- Squadron Leader John Henry Cook (45187), Royal Air Force.
- Squadron Leader Richard Alexander Robert Falconer, D.F.M. (47402), Royal Air Force.
- Squadron Leader Frederick Jack Higham, D.F.C . (101514), Royal Air Force.
- Squadron Leader Kenneth Gilbert Hubbard, D.F.C. (66539), Royal Air Force.
- Squadron Leader Thomas Owen Saunders (46772), Royal Air Force.
- Squadron Leader Charles Courtie Willott (43566), Royal Air Force.
- Acting Squadron Leader Melvin Clifford Seymour Shepherd (59006), Royal Air Force.
- Colonel (Temporary) Richard Mowbray Newton-King (I.A.730), Special List, ex-Indian Army, at present on loan to the Government of India.
- Lieutenant-Colonel Frederick Petrus Van Oudtshoorn, M.B.E., Commissioner of Police, Swaziland (now retired).

Civil Division

- John Owen Abraham, Principal Intelligence Officer, British Army of the Rhine.
- Mary Vyvyan Adams, Head of Television Talks, British Broadcasting Corporation.
- The Reverend Arthur Linden Agnew, J.P., Chairman, Northern Ireland Area, Royal Air Forces Association.
- Ernest Noel Aiers. For political services.
- Charles Graham Birkett Allinson, Chairman, Northampton & District Local Employment Committee.
- Horace Victor Armstrong, D.C.M. For political services.
- Marie Louise Arnold, Social Director, Hispanic and Luso-Brazilian Councils.
- William John Ashcroft, Chief Executive Officer, Ministry of Health.
- Victor Ewart Ashton, Senior Principal Clerk, Board of Inland Revenue.
- Eva Atherton, Chairman of the Housing Committee, Cheltenham Rural District Council.
- Harold Ayrey, M.B.E., Town Clerk of South Shields, County Borough Council.
- Frederick Thomas Ball, Controller of Transport, Ministry of Works.
- Clara Bamber, Member, Domestic Coal Consumers Council.
- Captain George Alfred Bannister, Commodore Captain, SS Andes, Royal Mail Lines, Ltd.
- John Howard Barringer, Air Traffic Control Officer I, Ministry of Civil Aviation.
- William Arnold Barter. For services to the Bristol Philharmonic Society.
- Arthur Bates, County Planning Officer, West Riding of Yorkshire County Council.
- Ronald Leslie Batley. For services as Chief Generation Engineer, Merseyside & North Wales Division, British Electricity Authority.
- David Ernest Bell, General Manager Yorkshire Woollen District Transport Company, Ltd.
- Marion Agnes, Lady Bennett. For political and public services in London.
- Sydney Arthur Berry, Chief Constable, Dumfries & Galloway Constabulary.
- David Ritchie Bishop, City Chamberlain, Aberdeen.
- Commander Charles William Blanchard, lately R.N.V.R., Boom Defence and Salvage Officer, Grade I, Admiralty.
- Horace Pearson Blyth, Assistant Director of Accounts, Air Ministry.
- Frederick Samuel Boas. For services to Literature.
- Arthur Alfred Frederick Boulton, Chief Officer, Cheshire Fire Brigade.
- Lieutenant-Colonel Frederick Arthur Bridgett. For services as Officer Commanding, Royal Army Service Corps Expeditionary Forces Institutes, Japan and Korea.
- Elizabeth Rachel Brinton, Principal, Board of Trade.
- John Henry Brookes, J.P., Principal, College of Technology, Art & Commerce, Oxford.
- Hugh Frederick Brown, Chief Engineer, SS Papanui, New Zealand Shipping Company, Ltd.
- Frank Bullock, J.P. For public services in Worcester.
- Frank Greenwood Burrell, Chairman and Joint Managing Director, Shipham & Company, Ltd., Hull.
- Cecil George Burton, Secretary, University of Birmingham.
- Alexander Calder, Director of Pig Supplies, Ministry of Food.
- Ernest Raymond Callender, Superintending Veterinary Officer, Ministry of Agriculture & Fisheries.
- Jean Muir Campbell, Grade 2 Officer, Ministry of Labour & National Service.
- Jocelyn Henry Bonham-Carter, Conference Officer, Grade I, Foreign Office.
- John Stanley Carter, Deputy Chief Alkali Inspector, Ministry of Housing & Local Government.
- Frederick Joseph Cattermole, Principal Inspector of Taxes, Board of Inland Revenue.
- Benjamin Sidney Clark, J.P., Chairman, Reading Local Employment Committee.
- John Hill Collingridge, Assistant Keeper, First Class, Public Record Office.
- Frank Cromwell, Controller of Office Services, Board of Trade.
- James Collie Cumming, Senior Meteorological Officer, London Airport, Air Ministry.
- Basil Curran, Director, Edward Gurran Engineering Company, Ltd., Cardiff.
- Kirwan Frank Curtis, T.D., Assistant Regional Controller, Southern Regional Office, Ministry of Labour & National Service.
- James Archibald Cuthbertson, Managing Director, James A. Cuthbertson, Ltd., Agricultural and General Engineers and Contractors, Biggar.
- Edmund Robertson Cuthill, Assistant Jute Controller, Ministry of Materials.
- John William Darbyshire, Headmaster, Belfast Royal Academy.
- Charles Findlay Davidson, District Geologist, Geological Survey and Museum, Department of Scientific & Industrial Research.
- George Davie, M.B.E., Secretary and Treasurer, Association of County Councils in Scotland.
- Horace Gilbert Davis, Chief Regional Engineer, North Western Region, General Post Office.
- Richard Jackson Dawson. For public services in Westmorland.
- Frederick William Deans, M.C., Principal Wages Adviser, General Post Office.
- John Wilson Drinkwater, Assistant Director of Engine Research, Ministry of Supply.
- Geoffrey Ernest Duke. For services to British motor-cycle racing.
- Neville Frederick Duke, D.S.O., D.F.C., A.F.C., Chief Test Pilot, Hawker Aircraft, Ltd.
- John Dunbar. For services to the herring curing industry.
- Arthur Albert Dyson, Managing Director, Erie Resistor, Ltd., Great Yarmouth.
- Walter William Early. For political and public services in the West Riding of Yorkshire.
- The Right Honourable Magdalen Mary, Countess of Eldon, Deputy President, Devon Branch, British Red Cross Society.
- John Osmond Middleton Fisher, General Manager, Humber Graving Dock & Engineering Company, Ltd., Immingham and Grimsby.
- Aidan Patrick Fitzgerald, Principal Officer, Ministry of Health & Local Government, Northern Ireland.
- Cecil William Fulker, M.B.E., Secretary, Parliamentary Committee, Co-Operative Union, Ltd.
- John Ralph Furlong, Principal of Colonial Products Advisory Bureau (Plant & Animal), Colonial Office.
- Commander Bernard William Galpin, Royal Navy (Retired), Manager, India, British Overseas Airways Corporation.
- Leonard Gardiner, Higher Waterguard Superintendent, London, Board of Customs & Excise.
- Frederic Ambrose George, Chairman, Missions to Seamen, Blyth.
- Arthur George Gibbs, Deputy Regional Controller, Northern Regional Office, Ministry of Labour & National Service.
- Joseph Edward Gibby, Chairman, Agricultural Panel of the Council for Wales & Monmouthshire.
- Catherine Edith Godman, Chairman, Princess Mary Village Homes, Addlestone, Weybridge, Surrey.
- Oscar William Godwin, Principal, Atomic Energy Division, Ministry of Supply.
- James William Grant, J.P., Chairman, Aberdare Disablement Advisory Committee.
- Commander (S) David Nisbet Gray, M.B.E., R.D., R.N.R., Chief Superintendent, Mercantile Marine Office Service, Ministry of Transport.
- Harold George Green, Higher Collector, Southampton, Board of Customs & Excise.
- Humphrey Greenall, Area Egg Officer for London, Ministry of Food.
- Arthur Griffiths, Production Director and General Manager, F. Perkins, Ltd., Peterborough.
- William Grigor, County Surveyor, Antrim County Council.
- Charles William Grindell, Director, Burt, Boulton & Haywood, Ltd.
- Brigadier James Utermarck Hall. For services as Deputy Command Secretary, Hong Kong, War Office.
- William Kenneth Hall, Works General Manager, Billingham Division, Imperial Chemical Industries, Ltd.
- Arnold Henry Mayne Harrison, Principal Information Officer, Central Office of Information.
- Wilfred George James Haynes, Principal Officer, Wales Region, Home Office.
- John Williamson Hendry. For political and public services in Glasgow.
- George Gordon Hewlett, Assistant Accountant General, Commonwealth Relations Office.
- Alan Hill, General Manager, No.6 Area, East Midlands Division, National Coal Board.
- Mildred Alice Hooke, J.P., Headmistress, Bradford Girls' Grammar School.
- Graham Llewellyn Hopkin, Senior Principal Scientific Officer, Ministry of Supply.
- Sidney Horsfield, General Secretary, National Society of Painters.
- John Everard Hosking, Managing Director, English Flax Fibres, Ltd.
- Joseph William Hough, Borough Treasurer of Islington.
- Edward Morgan Humphreys. Writer on Welsh Affairs.
- Sinclair Hunter, T.D., Head of Administration and Secretary, Colonial Development Corporation.
- Thomas Hunter, lately Headmaster, Grantown Grammar School, Morayshire.
- Robert Hutchinson, Chairman, Nottingham District, Advisory Committee, North Midland Regional Board, Board of Trade.
- Edward Maurice Isaacs, Director, Manchester Tuesday Concerts Society.
- Robert Cyril Morton Jenkins, Deputy Chief Constable of Kent.
- Harry Johnston, Chief Engineer, North Eastern Gas Board.
- John Emlyn Jones, T.D., Senior Engineer, Wales & Monmouth Divisional Road Engineer's Office, Ministry of Transport.
- Tom Jones, Officer Grade I, Joint Intelligence Bureau, Ministry of Defence.
- Colin Edward Arthur John Keeling, Chairman, Creamery Cheese Manufacturers Committee, of the National Association of Creamery Proprietors.
- John Killey, M.B.E., Representative for South Wales, National Savings Committee.
- Ernest Eric Ritchie Kilner, T.D. For political and public services in Yorkshire.
- Charles Sylvanus Kingdon, Area Distribution Officer, (Milk Products), South-West England and South Wales, Ministry of Food.
- Lewis Morris Lambie, Chief Executive Officer, Ministry of National Insurance.
- Frederick Albert Lawman, Honorary County Organiser, Forces Help Society, Cheshire.
- Archibald Henry Lee, M.C., Secretary, National Museum of Wales.
- Ethel Rex Lewis, R.R.C., Principal Nursing Officer, Soldiers', Sailors' and Airmen's Families Association.
- Captain James Curry Leybourne, lately Master, SS British Talent, British Tanker Company, Ltd.
- Alderman Constance Leyland, M.B.E. For political and public services in Essex.
- Commander Douglas Gordon Longmuir, R.N.R. (Retired). For service as Divisional Sea Transport Officer, Middle East, Ministry of Transport.
- Frank Gibbon Lowden, Chief Buyer, Cars and Trucks, Ford Motor Company, Ltd., Dagenham.
- Walter Fullarton Lownie, lately Deputy Chief Architect and Surveyor, Department of Agriculture for Scotland.
- Daniel Ferguson Connell Lumsden, J.P., Assistant Regional Controller, Scotland Ministry of National Insurance.
- Roy Gordon Lyle, First Class Valuer, Board of Inland Revenue.
- Cecil Holmes Lyon, Clerk, London Executive Council, National Health Service.
- John Lusk Torrens McAdam, M.C., Principal Officer, Ministry of Agriculture, Northern Ireland.
- Norman McKinven McCallum, Head Postmaster, Edinburgh.
- John Alexander McConachie, J.P., Secretary, North-Eastern Regional Hospital Board, Scotland.
- Archibald Duncan MacKellar, Divisional Organiser (Scotland & Northern Ireland), Association of Engineering & Shipbuilding Draughtsmen.
- Ieuan Maddock, Principal Scientific Officer, Ministry of Supply.
- John Hayes Marriott, Civil Assistant, War Office.
- Arthur Ratcliffe Martin, Chairman, Rotherham and Mexborough Hospital Management Committee.
- Esther Martin, M.B.E., Director, National Service Hostels Corporation.
- Brevet Colonel Maurice Kershaw Matthews, T.D., Chairman, London Trustee Savings Bank.
- Charles Joseph Mays, Schedules Superintendent (Road Transport), London Transport Executive.
- Gladys Mabel Mills, J.P. For political and public services in Warwickshire.
- Sidney Mitchell, J.P. For public service in the Rhondda.
- William Henry Moffatt, County Inspector, Royal Ulster Constabulary.
- Elizabeth Wright Montford. For public services in North Staffordshire.
- George Warwick Robbins Morgan, Chief Accountant, Ministry of Fuel & Power.
- Ernest Harold Mott, Senior Principal Scientific Officer, Ministry of Supply.
- Frederick William Nicholas Murphy, M.B.E., Superintendent, Royal Ordnance Factory, Swynnerton.
- George Henry Murphy, Fire Service Commander, Northern Ireland Fire Service.
- Arthur Clive Nicholson. For services to the development of agricultural machinery.
- Elizabeth Jane Noble. For political and public services in Belfast.
- Percy Bertram Boyd Oldfield. For political and public services in Surrey.
- Alfred Davies Palmer, Chief Executive Officer, Forestry Commission.
- Sidney John Palmer, Acting Chief Constructor and Professor of Naval Architecture, Royal Naval College, Greenwich.
- The Honourable Dorothy Mary Parkinson. For political and public services in Yorkshire.
- Frederick Alfred Partridge, Foreign Office.
- Charles Albert Pearce, M.B.E., M.C., Deputy Accountant General, Ministry of Pensions.
- Walter Collier Potter, Honorary Treasurer, Empire Forestry Association.
- John Robert Potts, J.P., Member of the Council, Carlisle & District State Management Scheme, and Chairman of the Local Advisory Committee.
- Henry Richard Friday, M.B.E., J.P., Regional Secretary, Transport & General Workers' Union.
- John Dryden Rae, Principal, H.M. Treasury.
- Wilfrid Raffle, M.R.C.S., L.R.C.P., Principal Medical Officer, Ministry of Pensions.
- Rowland John Raggett, Secretary, Territorial & Auxiliary Forces Association of Hampshire & Isle of Wight.
- John Hubert Ray, Secretary, British Trawlers Federation.
- William Russell Rees, H.M. Inspector of Schools, Ministry of Education.
- Emrys Haddon Roberts, M.B.E., Representative for North Wales, National Savings Committee.
- George Albert Edward Roberts, Secretary, Irish Linen Guild.
- Arthur Eric Linton Robey, lately President, Building Industry Distributors.
- Percy Martin Robson, Expense Accounts Officer, H.M. Dockyard, Chatham.
- Percival Marchant Selby, President, Theatrical Managers Association.
- Lieutenant-Colonel Samuel Shaverin, M.B.E., Chairman, Leyton, Walthamstow & District War Pensions Committee.
- Charles Siddle, Deputy Principal Regional Officer, Newcastle Region, Ministry of Housing & Local Government.
- Oliver Simon, Typographer, Chairman and Managing Director of the Curwen Press.
- Horace Edward William Simons, Deputy Chief Lands Officer, Air Ministry.
- Dorothy Edith Slater, J.P., Chairman, Lynton Urban District Council.
- The Reverend Prebendary Albert Smith. For services as Superintendent Chaplain, Royal Association in Aid of the Deaf and Dumb.
- Eric Lauder Caldwell-Smith, M.B., M.R.C.S., Chief Medical Officer, Shipping Federation Ltd.
- Graham Thomas Dow-Smith, Trade Commissioner, Grade II, Nairobi, Board of Trade.
- Philip Lewis Smith, M.B.E., Principal, H.M. Treasury.
- Fredric Keith Stewart, Deputy Comptroller of Accounts, Ministry of Works.
- Reginald Vaughan Wood Stock, M.C. Chief Engineer, Thames Conservancy.
- Leonard Boole Stott, M.C., M.B., Ch.B., Chief Medical Officer, Papworth Village Settlement.
- Frederick Harvey Stuart, Managing Director, Stuart & Sons, Ltd., Stourbridge.
- Richard Edward Knight Thesiger, Senior Legal Assistant, Lord Chancellor's Office.
- Arthur Thomas Thomson, Chairman, Mexborough Local Employment Committee.
- William Joseph Vellacott Thorne, Chief Executive Officer, Ministry of National Insurance.
- Bertram Rodolphe Hermann Tombleson, Deputy Controller, Valuation Branch, Board of Customs & Excise.
- Cornelius John Townsend, J.P., Chairman, Salford Savings Committee.
- Nathan Turk, Chairman, Westminster Savings Committee.
- Ernest Sackville Turner, Editor, Soldier Magazine, War Office.
- Frederick George Turner, Chief Investment Manager, Public Trustee Office.
- Nora Frances Warmington, M.B.E., Head of Personnel Department, Women's Voluntary Services Headquarters.
- William Donald Watson, M.B.E., Principal, Scottish Home Department.
- Alderman Charles William Whatley, Deputy Chairman, Wiltshire Agricultural Executive Committee.
- Alderman Leonard William Arthur White. For political and public services in Nottinghamshire.
- Tatham Whitehead, Senior Plant Pathologist, National Agricultural Advisory Service, Wales.
- Samuel Wickins, Chairman, Gloucester and Stroud Local Appeal Tribunal set up under the National Insurance Acts.
- James William Wilkinson, Director, Pay and Records, British Council.
- Olive Ethel Williams. For political services.
- Tudor Williams, Headmaster, Queen Elizabeth Grammar School, Carmarthen.
- Lieutenant-Colonel William Jones Williams, Chief Constable of Gwynedd Constabulary.
- Audrey Withers, Editor of Vogue, Member of the Council of Industrial Design.
- Alderman Alfred Wright, J.P. For political and public services in Middlesex.
- Kenneth Anthony Wright, Assistant Head of Music (Television), British Broadcasting Corporation.

==== Members (MBE) ====
Military Division

- Wardmaster Lieutenant Kenneth Alfred Jack Chapman, Royal Navy (Retired).
- Senior Commissioned Gunner (T) Archibald Hector Joseph Eley, Royal Navy.
- First Officer Doris Evelyn Hollinghurst, Women's Royal Naval Service.
- Communication Lieutenant Leonard Percy Hubbard, Royal Navy.
- Senior Commissioned Observer Herbert John Lambert, D.S.M., Royal Navy.
- Shipwright Lieutenant Edward Charles Le Gassick, Royal Navy (Retired).
- Lieutenant (E) Thomas Ernest Meopham, Royal Navy (Retired).
- Lieutenant (L) Harry Albert Minns, Royal Navy.
- Skipper Lieutenant-Commander William John Valentine Mullender, D.S.C., R.D., R.N.R. (Retired).
- Lieutenant-Commander (S) Arthur Leonard Pearcey, Royal Navy.
- Lieutenant-Commander Victor Reginald Thorne Rogers, R.N.V.R.
- Lieutenant-Commander (E) Robert Stanley Hogg Silburn, Royal Navy (Retired).
- Lieutenant-Commander Denis Theodore John Stanley, D.F.C., Royal Navy.
- No.5825555 Warrant Officer Class I (Acting) Charles Arthur Ainger, The Suffolk Regiment (attached The Parachute Regiment).
- Major (Acting) Reginald Emmanuel Amos (290171), Army Cadet Force.
- Major Cecil Henry Marshall Attwood (85705), Royal Tank Regiment, Royal Armoured Corps.
- Major Beatrice Mary Balmer (252561), Women's Royal Army Corps.
- Major (Quartermaster) Charles Arthur Bloxham (102664), Royal Army Service Corps.
- Major John Robert Burgess (95592), The Somerset Light Infantry (Prince Albert's).
- Major Vera Burke (250002), Women's Royal Army Corps, Territorial Army.
- Major Campbell William Ducie Chads (18810), The Green Howards (Alexandra Princess of Wales's Own Yorkshire Regiment).
- Major (Assistant Paymaster) Benjamin Horace Clark (107460), Royal Army Pay Corps.
- Major Percy Lionel George Cole (301134), Royal Army Medical Corps.
- Major (Temporary) Edward Collins (118094), Royal Army Service Corps.
- Captain Andrew Craighead (175397), The Black Watch (Royal Highland Regiment).
- Major (Temporary) Leonard Peter Critchley (145020), The Buffs (Royal East Kent Regiment).
- No.2870334 Warrant Officer Class II Forbes Davidson, The Gordon Highlanders, Territorial Army.
- Major Robert Gordon Diss (102207), General List.
- Major (Temporary) Michael Leslie Dunbar (112919), The Cameronians (Scottish Rifles) (Seconded to The Parachute Regiment).
- Major Joseph Harold Eltringham, T.D. (75279), Royal Regiment of Artillery, Territorial Army.
- Major Herbert Eagleson Farley (86550), Royal Regiment of Artillery, Territorial Army.
- Major (Quartermaster) George William Gibson, T.D., (78276), Royal Regiment of Artillery, Territorial Army.
- Major Peter Howard Girling (95692), Corps of Royal Electrical and Mechanical Engineers.
- Major (Temporary) Ivor Charles Gurney (262317), Corps of Royal Electrical and Mechanical Engineers.
- Major (Temporary) Henry Charles Haines (126052), Corps of Royal Engineers.
- Major (Quartermaster) Horace Hammond (154755), Royal Pioneer Corps.
- No.1866785 Warrant-Officer-Class I George Robert Harris, Corps of Royal Electrical and Mechanical Engineers.
- Major (Temporary) Arthur Bamford Hartley (276453), Corps of Royal Engineers.
- Major Ryland Victor Hawker (378423), Royal Regiment of Artillery.
- Major (Acting) John Henderson, M.M. (367271), Combined Cadet Force.
- Major (Quartermaster) Frank Leigh Hinton (107147), The Welch Regiment.
- Major (Temporary) William Holland (152399), Corps of Royal Engineers.
- Major (Temporary) Frederick Raymond Howell (224126), Corps of Royal Engineers.
- Major (Temporary) John Hubberstey (120648), Army Catering Corps.
- Major Carlisle Patrick Harold Eld Huxford, (53595), Royal Regiment of Artillery.
- Major Glynn Edward Vincent Jones (66010), Royal Regiment of Artillery.
- Captain George Ernest Knight (349995), Corps of Royal Engineers.
- Captain (Quartermaster) Matthew Connel Lamb (257155), The Highland Light Infantry (City of Glasgow Regiment).
- Major David Alexander Keppel Legge (67109), The Royal Fusiliers (City of London Regiment).
- Major (Temporary) Robert Henry Heywood Lonsdale, M.C. (78312), Grenadier Guards.
- Major (Quartermaster) Albert Gordon Austin Mines (86048), Royal Army Medical Corps.
- Major (Quartermaster) William Morrison (128527), The Highland Light Infantry (City of Glasgow Regiment).
- Major Harold George Muggeridge (222907), Royal Army Ordnance Corps.
- No.1869094 Warrant Officer Class II Kenneth Noble, Corps of Royal Engineers.
- Captain (Ordnance Executive Officer) Stanley Howard North. (359535), Royal Army Ordnance Corps.
- Major (Temporary) Charles Albert Norton (GDF/O/7008), Gibraltar Defence Force.
- No.747596 Warrant Officer Class I William Parry, Royal Regiment of Artillery, Territorial Army.
- Major (now Lieutenant Colonel (Temporary)) Roger Vivian Peters (222005), Royal Army Ordnance Corps.
- Major (Quartermaster) Albert Edward Plumridge (100059), Royal Regiment of Artillery.
- Major (Local Lieutenant-Colonel) Harry Porter (137759), Royal Regiment of Artillery.
- No.781764 Warrant Officer Class I Tom Raithby, Royal Regiment of Artillery.
- No.S/52935 Warrant Officer Class I George Dunlop Robinson, Royal Army Service Corps.
- No.772043 Warrant Officer Class II George William Saunders, Royal Regiment of Artillery.
- Major (Temporary) Frank William Lyster Shepard (128587), Corps of Royal Engineers.
- Major (Quartermaster) Edmund Arthur Skinner, T.D. (89974), The South Lancashire Regiment (Prince of Wales's Volunteers), Territorial Army.
- Major William Alan Smallman (93086), Royal Army Service Corps.
- Captain Philip Glynne Snow (285091), Royal Army Pay Corps.
- Captain Arthur Alma Robert Soar (341016), Corps of Royal Electrical and Mechanical Engineers.
- No.S/54454 Warrant Officer Class I John Stiff, Royal Army Service Corps.
- Major (Temporary) Richard Ellis Thomas (187959), Royal Army Service Corps.
- No.4687436 Warrant Officer Class II Herbert Thwaites, Small Arms School Corps.
- Major Howard Doulton Ward (95650), Royal Tank Regiment, Royal Armoured Corps.
- Captain (Cipher Officer) Lionel George Wardley (163504), Royal Corps of Signals.
- No.S/4614101 Warrant Officer Class II Robert Adlington West, Royal Army Service Corps.
- Major (Acting) William Wheeler (332027), Army Cadet Force.
- Captain (Temporary) William Woods (328717), Royal Army Medical Corps.
- Major Cecil Raymond Brookes Wrenford, T.D. (32911), Combined Cadet Force.
- Captain Charles Ambrose Tudor Wright (140384), Royal Regiment of Artillery, Territorial Army.
- Squadron Leader Brian Linden Davis (69473), Royal Air Force.
- Acting Squadron Leader Walter Neville Lenton, A.M.I.Mun.E. (202428), Royal Air Force.
- Acting Squadron Officer Nancy Stephens Palmer (833), Women's Royal Air Force.
- Acting Squadron Leader Percy Harry Robinson, M.C., PhD, BSc (62563), Royal Air Force Volunteer Reserve.
- Acting Squadron Leader Tom Desmond Spencer (48535), Royal Air Force.
- Flight Lieutenant William Edward Bartlett (46021), Royal Air Force.
- Flight Lieutenant Frank Richard Blythman (59146), Royal Air Force.
- Flight Lieutenant Clifford Cole (143777), Royal Air Force.
- Flight Lieutenant George Cubby (139255), Royal Air Force.
- Flight Lieutenant Arthur Frederick Grubb (47674), Royal Air Force.
- Flight Lieutenant Albert Walter Harding (162229), Royal Air Force.
- Flight Officer Margaret Mair Hunter (1355), Women's Royal Auxiliary Air Force.
- Flight Lieutenant Arthur Thomas Jarrett (48485), Royal Air Force.
- Flight Lieutenant Edward William Wynn Kemp (57571), Royal Air Force.
- Flight Lieutenant Leslie Ronald Hordley King (51566), Royal Air Force.
- Flight Lieutenant Herbert Thomas Robinson (50066), Royal Air Force.
- Flight Lieutenant Patrick Daley Shearwood (175378), Royal Air Force.
- Flight Lieutenant Bronislaw Jerzy Skibinski (500021), Royal Air Force.
- Flight Lieutenant James Lester Sole (136660), Royal Auxiliary Air Force.
- Flight Lieutenant Walter Montague Gordon Wing, D.F.M (132606), Royal Air Force.
- Acting Flight Lieutenant George Norman Earp (111317), Royal Air Force Volunteer Reserve.
- Flying Officer Stanley Richard Podmore (531557), Royal Air Force.
- Warrant Officer Cyril Allcock (513738), Royal Air Force.
- Warrant Officer Joseph Henry Bollard (345384), Royal Air Force.
- Warrant Officer Frederick William Gathergood (514150), Royal Air Force.
- Warrant Officer Eric Brown Gillinder (514785), Royal Air Force.
- Warrant Officer Percy Parkes (355581), Royal Air Force.
- Warrant Officer Ivor William Rebbeck (514388), Royal Air Force.
- Warrant Officer Thomas Charles Sainsbury (590116), Royal Air Force.
- Warrant Officer Alfred Frederick Shrubsole (518150), Royal Air Force.

Civil Division

- Ethel Olga Allen, Higher Executive Officer, Ministry of Education.
- Major Archibald Cowie Alston. For political services in Kinross and West Perthshire.
- Arthur Andrews, Member, Monmouthshire Agricultural Executive Committee.
- Harold Perkins Arney, Higher Executive Officer, H.M. Treasury.
- Millicent Ash, Senior Health Visitor, City of Leicester.
- John Henry Aston, Chairman, National Association of Land Settlement Association Tenants.
- Frederic William Atkinson, Chief Clerk of Works, Ministry of Works.
- Benjamin Audus, J.P., Honorary Branch Secretary, National Union of Agricultural Workers.
- George Stanley Bailey, Headmaster and Superintendent, Ashford Residential School, Middlesex.
- Lawrence Michael Baker, Senior Executive Officer, Home Office.
- Arthur Banks, Chairman, Heywood Local Employment Committee.
- Miriam Clara Bartlett, Grade 4 Officer, 'Branch B' of the Foreign Service, Foreign Office.
- Frederick Kilham Bass, Farmer, Wingland Estate, Lincolnshire and Norfolk.
- Herbert Victor Batten, lately Senior Scientific Assistant, British Museum.
- May Alexina Bayne Beale. For political services in Scotland.
- John Donald Beard, Honorary Secretary, Oldbury Savings Committee, Birmingham.
- Ernest Bellas, lately Senior Office Clerk, House of Commons.
- John William Benge, Regional Collector of Taxes, Board of Inland Revenue.
- Leonard Benn, Member, Loughborough Local Employment Committee and Disablement Advisory Committee.
- Emily Williama Protheroe-Beynon. For political and public services in Carmarthen.
- Eric Stanley Birch, Assistant to the General Manager, Port of London Authority.
- Frederick Arthur Birch, M.M., Chief Male Nurse, Broadmoor Institution.
- Ernest George Alfred Birkett, Area Engineer, United Automobile Services, Ltd., British Transport Commission.
- George Bertram Blackall, Clerk, Corby Urban District Council.
- Edward Henry Blackburn, D.C.M., Assistant Secretary and Accounting Officer, Army Cadet Force Association.
- Kate Emma Blake, Domiciliary Midwife, Norwich.
- Herbert Nugent Blockey, Works Manager, Bourjois, Ltd.
- Robert Blow, J.P., Chief Officer, Labour Hostels, Lincolnshire (Holland), Ministry of Agriculture & Fisheries.
- Robert Cyril Blues, Chairman, Liverpool West Derby Sea Cadet Corps Unit.
- Arthur George Booth, Chief Technical Engineer, Humber Limited, Coventry.
- John Frederick Booth, Managing Director, Hepworth Iron Company, Ltd., Sheffield.
- Emily Mary Bowles. For political and public services in St. Pancras.
- James Bowyer, Honorary Secretary, Redlands Gardens Association, Glasgow.
- Ernest James Braby, Assistant Chief Constable, Berkshire.
- Charles Douglas Bramley, Higher Technical Officer (Grade B), Directorate of Fortifications & Works, War Office.
- George Cuthbert Brazier, Higher Executive Officer, Ministry of Civil Aviation.
- Frances Emilie Briggs, Secretary, British Drama League.
- Observer Commander Charles Dudley Bright, Group Commandant, No. 14 Group, Royal Observer Corps.
- Henry John Brook, Executive Officer, Ministry of Education.
- Arthur Howard Brown, lately Higher Executive Officer, Office of the National Insurance Commissioner, Ministry of National Insurance.
- Peter Renwick Brown, Children's Officer, County Council of Lanark.
- William Brown, Undermanager, Bentley Colliery, North Eastern Division, National Coal Board.
- Evelyn Augusta Brutton. For political and public services in Portsmouth.
- John Pierce Buchanan, Temporary Administrative Officer, Admiralty.
- Ethel Jessie Buck, Private Secretary to the General Manager, Chamber of Shipping of the United Kingdom.
- Geoffrey Patrick Burnham, Divisional Officer III, London Auxiliary Fire Service.
- Frank Burr, District Secretary, Transport & General Workers' Union, Middlesbrough.
- Lyonel Peckover Burrill. For political and public services in Denbighshire and Flintshire.
- William Charles Burton, Senior Supervisor, Lotus, Ltd.
- Ethel May Busbridge, Centre Organiser, Bromley, Kent, Women's Voluntary Services.
- Robert Frank Bushrod, Traffic Manager, Wiltshire & Dorset Motor Services, Ltd.
- Captain Alexander Nicol Cameron, Head of Department of Navigation, Sir John Cass College, Aldgate.
- Thomas Mitchell Cameron, Director, Alexander Findlay & Company, Ltd., Motherwell.
- Elizabeth Campbell, Chairman, Beckenham Food Control Committee.
- Roland Charles Carter, Grade 3 Officer, Ministry of Labour & National Service.
- Ronald Herbert Arthur Carter, Senior Experimental Officer, Telecommunication Research Establishment, Malvern, Ministry of Supply.
- Herman Chalkley, Registrar of Births, Deaths & Marriages, and Census Officer, Luton.
- John Chalmers. For political and public services in South Shields.
- Elizabeth Amelia Cheeseman, J.P., Honorary Secretary, Forces Help Society and Lord Roberts Workshops, Balham, Streatham and Tooting.
- Frank John Childs, Inspector of Taxes, Higher Grade, Board of Inland Revenue.
- Alderman Catherine Campbell Chisholm, J.P. For political and public services in East London and Essex.
- William Bernard George Chisholm, Grade 3 Officer, 'Branch B' of the Foreign Service, Foreign Office.
- Edith Rose Clayton, Home Nurse, Lee District Nursing Service.
- Robert Frank Clement, Maintenance Engineer, Southdown Motor Services, Ltd.
- Thomas Cleminson, Chief Superintendent and Deputy Chief Constable, Salford City Police Force.
- John William Ernest Clemons, lately Assistant Map Curator, War Office.
- Amy Sunderland Clewer. For services to the Boy Scout Movement in Bradford.
- Hilda Dorothy Clinch, Higher Executive Officer, Savings Department, General Post Office.
- Captain Arnold Graham Cole, R.N.R. (Retired), Honorary Secretary, Yarmouth, Isle of Wight Lifeboat Station.
- Horace Gorton Cole, Commercial Adviser to Managing Director, Michelin Tyre Company, Ltd.
- Charles Conaty, Departmental Civilian Officer, West Lancashire Territorial & Auxiliary Forces Association.
- John Convey, Member, York Local Employment Committee and Disablement Advisory Committee.
- Beryl Mary Conybeare, Senior Welfare Officer, British Red Cross Society, Japan and Korea.
- Kate Elizabeth Cooke. For political and public services in Lincolnshire.
- Fred Coote. For services as Area Engineer, Southampton, General Post Office.
- Perkins Cowls, Honorary Secretary, Helston & Kerrier Savings Committee, Cornwall.
- George William Cox, B.E.M., Assistant Superintendent (Telecommunications), Ministry of Civil Aviation.
- John James Crampton, Civilian Administrative Officer to Fighter and Transport Commands, Air Ministry.
- Arthur Sidney Cray, Member, Petersfield District Committee, Hampshire Agricultural Executive Committee.
- William Henry Leopold Cutts, J.P. For political and public services in Camberwell.
- Gerald Harding Daly, D.S.M., Regional Studio Engineer, West Region, British Broadcasting Corporation.
- Olive Winifred Davey, Executive Officer, Board of Trade.
- William Handel Davies, Manager, Coventry Employment Exchange, Ministry of Labour & National Service.
- Harry Donald Davis, D.S.O., Senior Executive Officer, Board of Customs & Excise.
- Walter Dawson, J.P. For political and public services in Sheffield.
- William Watson Dawson, Experimental Officer, Servicing Research & Development Branch, Ministry of Supply.
- Albert Cyril Dean, Senior Executive Officer, Ministry of National Insurance.
- Francis George Dean, District Operating Superintendent, Worcester, Western Region, Railway Executive.
- Sidney Domville, Works Manager, Curran Steels, Ltd., Cardiff.
- Ann Courtenay Douglas, Vice-Chairman, British Gliding Association.
- Marcella May Douglas, Organiser, Ulster Savings Committee.
- Alderman Arthur Edward Dunham, Chairman, Horncastle District Committee, Lincolnshire (Lindsey) Agricultural Executive Committee.
- Doris Adeline Eaton, Honorary National Secretary, Women's Junior Air Corps.
- Phyllis Mary Eglington, Honorary County Organiser for the Blood Transfusion Service in Staffordshire.
- Catherine Lucy Elgar, Shorthand Typist, Ministry of Housing & Local Government.
- Charles Ellingham, lately District Food Executive Officer, Chelmsford District, Ministry of Food.
- Francis Mechan Ellingham, Senior Captain, Salvation Army, British Army of the Rhine.
- Harold John Phillips Ellis, Higher Executive Officer, Board of Inland Revenue.
- Albert Elson, Accident Prevention Officer, Samuel Fox Company Branch, United Steel Companies, Ltd.
- Doris Katharine Mary Sweet-Escott, Honorary Secretary and Resident Hostel Manager, Anglo-Egyptian Aid Society.
- John Herbert Evernden, Youth Employment Officer, Croydon County Borough.
- John Henry Evers, lately Manager, South Shields Employment Exchange, Ministry of Labour & National Service.
- Sidney Herbert Eyres, Senior Executive Officer, Command Secretariat, Middle East Land Forces, War Office.
- Alfred Henry Farman, Chief Radio Officer, SS Queen Elizabeth.
- Albert William Farrell, Chief Office Clerk, Fees Office, House of Commons.
- Doris Mary Finch, County Organiser, Berkshire Women's Voluntary Services.
- Ivor Frederick Fisher, Works Manager, British Timken, Ltd., Duston.
- Frederick Fletcher, Manager, Special Technical Productions, General Electric Company, Ltd.
- James Park Forsyth, Area Meat Agent and Retail Meat Trade Adviser, Ministry of Food.
- William Forsyth, Town Clerk and Chamberlain, Burgh of Sanquhar.
- Richard Francis, Farmer, Sutton Coldfield, Staffordshire.
- Ivor Alfred Walter Franklin, Higher Executive Officer, Ministry of Housing & Local Government.
- Lucy Frossell, Organiser of Needlework and Women's Subjects, Newcastle upon Tyne Education Authority.
- Sidney Robert Fry, Vice-Chairman, Camden Town Local Employment Committee.
- Reginald Furness, Chairman, Warrington, Widnes & District Society for the Blind.
- Mary Fullarton Fyfe. For political and public services in Glasgow.
- George Richard Alfred Gardner, Higher Executive Officer, Tithe Redemption Commission.
- Joseph Richard Garwood, Divisional Superintendent (Central Road Services), London Transport Executive.
- Constance Hannah Gaskill, Higher Clerical Officer, Admiralty.
- Kate Gaymer. For political and public services in South Norfolk.
- Annie Lowes Gibb, Higher Executive Officer, Ministry of Agriculture & Fisheries.
- Charles John Gillard, District Officer, H.M. Coastguard, Ministry of Transport.
- Frederick William Clark Godden, Senior Executive Officer, Board of Trade.
- Edwin George Govas, Senior Executive Officer, Central Land Board & War Damage Commission.
- Alfred Graham, Assistant Superintending Engineer and Constructor of Shipping, British Commonwealth Korean Base, War Office.
- Janet Flora Alexandra Graham, County Director, Inverness-shire Branch, British Red Cross Society.
- Captain Elger Grant, Member, Hull, Beverley & District War Pensions Committee.
- Emily Muriel Greenfield, Staff Officer, Ministry of Commerce, Northern Ireland.
- Alfred Roy Greenway, District Manager, Malaya, Navy, Army & Air Force Institutes.
- Anne Griffith, J.P. For public services in Anglesey.
- Ernest James Griffith. For political and public services in the West Riding of Yorkshire.
- Gordon Vernon Griffiths, Borough Engineer and Surveyor, Port Talbot.
- Maude Millicent Griffiths, Welfare Officer, Birmingham & Midland Motor Omnibus Company, Ltd.
- William Charles Balmain Griffiths. For services as Head of the Service Department, Navigators & Engineer Officers Union.
- Henry John Grimsey, Secretary, National Arbitration Tribunal and Industrial Disputes Tribunal, Ministry of Labour & National Service.
- Walter John Gulliver, Inspector of Works (Buildings), Shawbury Section Office, Air Ministry.
- Wilfred Arthur Gunstone, Postmaster, Erith, Kent.
- Theodore Guthrie, Technical Manager, Swan Hunter & Wigham Richardson, Ltd., Newcastle upon Tyne.
- Captain Victor Hailey, Senior Assistant Land Commissioner, Ministry of Agriculture and Fisheries.
- Arthur Hall, Higher Executive Officer, Board of Trade.
- John Halliwell, Operating Officer, Northern District, North Western Division, Docks & Inland Waterways Executive.
- James Lindsay Hamilton, Personnel Manager, Northern Aluminium Company, Ltd., Rogerstone, Monmouthshire.
- Alfred Stanley Hands, M.C., lately Chief Shipping Officer, Ministry of Food.
- Henry Philip Harding, Information Officer, Central Office of Information.
- Christina Harries, County Organiser, Pembrokeshire, Women's Voluntary Services.
- Beatrice Anne Harrison, County Organiser, Selkirkshire, Women's Voluntary Services.
- Heather Wakeford Hatherly, War Office.
- Arthur Sydney Helms, lately Generation Engineer, South Eastern Division, British Electricity Authority.
- Commander John Hennessy, R.D., R.N.R. (Retired), Senior Nautical Officer, Meteorological Office, Air Ministry.
- Frederick Herdman, Engineer Manager, Gun Mounting Department, Vickers-Armstrongs, Ltd., Barrow-in-Furness.
- Reginald Edward Charles Higgins, Higher Executive Officer, Ministry of Transport.
- James Roland Hill, Senior Executive Officer, Ministry of Fuel & Power.
- Margaret Hiscox, Controller of Typists, War Office.
- Charles Francklin Hobday, Higher Executive Officer, Department of Agriculture for Scotland.
- Helen Hobson, Chairman, Women's Section, Northern Ireland Area of the British Legion (Belfast Branch).
- Reginald Frederick Edward, Howard-Hodges, Director, Public Safety Division, Royal Society for the Prevention of Accidents.
- Stephen Holliday, Executive Officer, Passport Office, Foreign Office.
- Arthur Ernest Tulloch Howell, lately Senior Executive Officer, Ministry of Fuel & Power.
- Hywel Morgan Hughes, Assistant to the United Kingdom Trade Commissioner at Delhi.
- James Edward Humphrey, lately Senior Executive Officer, Ministry of Materials.
- Henry Edward Humphrys, Deputy Chief Fire Officer, Somerset.
- Herbert Atlee Hunt, Chairman, Trowbridge Youth Employment Committee.
- Minnie Adelaide Hutton, Executive Officer, Ministry of Health.
- David Mellor Jameson, Senior Design Surveyor, Air Registration Board.
- Frank Johnson, District House Coal Officer, Sheffield, House Coal Distribution (Emergency) Scheme.
- Gwendolyn Mary Rosabel Johnston, Honorary Producer, Belfast Amateur Operatic Society.
- William Frederick Selby Jolley, Higher Executive Officer, Ministry of Transport.
- Douglas George Jones, Works Cost Accountant, E.K. Cole, Ltd., Southend-on-Sea.
- Harold Shaw Jones, Chief Engineer, Round Oak Steel Works, Ltd. Brierley Hill, Staffordshire.
- James Larkin Jones, Coventry District Secretary, Transport & General Workers Union.
- John Francis Jones, Honorary Secretary, Dearne Savings Committee, West Riding of Yorkshire.
- Leonard Albert Jouning, Works Manager, Aron Electricity Meter, Ltd.
- David Kay, Chief Flying Instructor, Strathtay Flying Club, Perth.
- Randal Keane, Training Secretary, National Association of Boys' Clubs.
- Herbert Kirk Kennedy, Manager, Government Training Centre, Hull, Ministry of Labour & National Service.
- Eleanor Martha King, Headmistress, Rosemary Street Nursery School, Bristol.
- James Christian King. For political services.
- Thomas Kirkup, General Manager, Palliser Magnesia Works, Hartlepool.
- Leonard Francis Lacour, Chief Technical Assistant to the Director, John Innes Institution.
- Eric George Lambert, Clerical Officer, Far East Station, Admiralty.
- Captain Frank Wellesley Warren Langley, Deputy Commissioner, National Savings Committee.
- Gilbert Lawson, Alderman, Brighouse Borough Council.
- Richard Lee, M.M., Higher Executive Officer, Ministry of Civil Aviation.
- Harold Lewis, Headmaster, Hubberston Primary School, Milford Haven, Pembrokeshire.
- Nicblas Liakhoff, Director of Training, Guide Dogs for the Blind Association.
- Margaret Anna Ligertwood, Matron, East Park Home for Infirm Children, Glasgow.
- Cyril Llewellyn, Senior Sales Superintendent, Telephone Manager's Office, Tunbridge Wells.
- Arthur James Long, Deputy Director, Establishments Division, H.M. Stationery Office.
- John Edgar Lucas, J.P., Secretary, Sheffield & District Branch, Plumbing Trades Union.
- Joseph Luke, District Inspector, Royal Ulster Constabulary.
- Duncan Macaskill, M.M., Assistant Postmaster, Head Post Office, Portree, Skye.
- Lilian Dalziel McDougall, Women's Voluntary Services Club Organiser, Sea View Holiday Camp, Port Said.
- Captain Frederick George Mace, Master, MV Goldfinch, The General Steam Navigation Company, Ltd.
- John McGrath, Senior Investigation Officer, Board of Customs & Excise.
- Walter Alexander Mackay, Purser, SS Cameronia, Anchor Line, Ltd.
- James John Mackenzie, Superintendent and Deputy Chief Constable, Angus Constabulary.
- Robert Alexander Macleod, Officer, Nottingham, Board of Customs & Excise.
- Harriet Macmillan, Head Teacher, Ardvasar Primary School, Skye.
- William James Campbell McQuitty, M.M., First Class Clerk, Supreme Court, Northern Ireland.
- Henry Walter Maguire, Accountant, McClelland Ker & Company.
- John Harold Maguire, Actuary, Bolton Savings Bank.
- Jean Dunn Malcolm, Higher Executive Officer, Department of Health for Scotland.
- Edward Melbourne Martin, Colliery Manager, Durham Division, National Coal Board.
- Sarah Martin, J.P., Joint County Organiser, East Suffolk, Women's Voluntary Services.
- Thomas Denzil Matkin, National Secretary, Retail Fruit Trade Federation.
- David Anthony Mattison, Senior Engineer, Ministry of Works.
- Eric Miles May, Higher Executive Officer, Ministry of Transport.
- George Thomas Maynard, Higher Executive Officer, Ministry of Transport.
- Douglas Sutherland Milward. For political and public services in Gloucestershire.
- Henry Moliver, Personnel Manager, Craven Brothers (Manchester), Ltd., Stockport.
- Robert Nathaniel Moore, J.P., Member, Shropshire Old People's Welfare Association.
- Charles Richard Dowman Murray, Senior Staff Officer, Admiralty.
- Raymond John Muskette, Higher Executive Officer in the Treasury Solicitor's Branch at the Ministry of Fuel & Power.
- John George Nevin, For public services in Northumberland.
- Bernard Lee Newbould, Manager, Steel Melting Department, Thomas Firth & John Brown, Ltd.
- David Mercier-Gorman Newburn, Secretary to the Lord Mayor of Belfast.
- Robert Newton, Inspector of Taxes, Board of Inland Revenue.
- John MacEwan Nicolson, Area Organiser, Scottish Savings Committee.
- Bertram Kenneth Nightingale, Surveyor, Sodbury Rural District Council.
- William Allan Noble, Inspector of Taxes, Higher Grade, Board of Inland Revenue.
- John Norman, Higher Executive Officer, Air Ministry.
- Arthur Norris, lately Chairman of Husborne-Crawley Parish Council.
- Jean Cadogan-Ogg, Clerical Officer, Office of the Chancellor of the Duchy of Lancaster.
- Thomas Dawkins Olver, Production Engineer, Manchester Group, North Western Gas Board.
- Alexander Orr, Column Officer (Third Officer), Lanarkshire Area Fire Brigade.
- Joan Orr, Civil Assistant, War Office.
- Idris Owen, Clerk to the Licensing Authority, South Wales Traffic Area, Ministry of Transport.
- Alderman Richard David Owen, J.P. For public services in Caernarvonshire.
- Charles Parker, Director and Works Manager, Raleigh Industries, Ltd., Nottingham.
- Leslie Parker, Surveyor and Chief Sanitary Inspector, Flaxton Rural District Council.
- Gustave Albert Parrott, Executive Engineer, Telephone Manager's Office, Leicester.
- Thomas Arthur Parry, Assistant Works Manager, Atomic Energy Establishment, Windscale, Ministry of Supply.
- Arthur Vernon Parsons, Senior Executive Officer, Ministry of Food.
- Sarah Patterson, Workers' Representative on Wages Councils in Northern Ireland.
- John William Pavey, Librarian, Ministry of Supply.
- Charles Horace Crosby Payne, Construction Designer, Billingham Division, Imperial Chemical Industries, Ltd.
- Henry Thomas Pegler, Chief Regional Enforcement Officer, London & South Eastern Region, Ministry of Food.
- Cecil Henry Petford, Personal Assistant to Divisional Controller, Midlands Division, British Electricity Authority.
- James Henry Plummer, Senior Experimental Officer, Armament Design Establishment, Ministry of Supply.
- Robert Poland, Clerical Officer, Headquarters, Aldershot District, War Office.
- James Horace Polson, Steel Foundry Moulding Shop Superintendent, David Brown Foundries Company, Yorkshire.
- William Harold Pope, Chief Executive Officer, Ministry of Pensions.
- Esme Raymond Wolverson Potter. For services to the Boys' Brigade in Liverpool.
- Conrad Thomas Price, M.C., Divisional Engineer, East Surrey Division, South Eastern Gas Board.
- Frances Bertha Prince, Chief Pharmacist, General Hospital, Nottingham.
- Austin Pryor, Registrar of Births, Deaths & Marriages, and Census Officer, South West Sheffield.
- Ann Rainford. For public services in Preston, Lancashire.
- Jessie Jane Ralph, lately Matron, West Cornwall Hospital, Penzance.
- Agnes Simpson Reid, Higher Executive Officer, H.M. Treasury.
- Peter Reid. For services to the Grimsby fishing industry.
- David Ritchie, Chief Superintendent, Liverpool City Police Force.
- James Robb, Senior. District Officer, National Agricultural Advisory Service, West Riding of Yorkshire.
- Henry John Eric Roberts, Senior Executive Officer, Ministry of Pensions.
- James McWilliam Robertson, lately Working Manager, Auchnafree, Perthshire.
- William George Robinson. For services as Chairman, Combined Cavalry "Old Comrades" Association.
- Kathleen Mary Rofe, Matron, Cronk Ruagh Sanatorium, Isle of Man.
- Percy James Roman, Chief Superintendent, Metropolitan Police Force.
- Richard Rothwell, Clerk, Alnwick Rural District Council.
- Frank Wycherley Round, Head of Branch, Registry of Friendly Societies.
- James Henry Rule, Honorary Secretary, Slough Savings Committee.
- Bruce Russell, Clerk, Higher Grade, Board of Inland Revenue.
- Frank Russell, Secretary, Small Pig-Keepers' Council.
- Edward Salthouse, Chief Draughtsman, Electrical Drawing Office, Harland & Wolff, Ltd., Belfast.
- Beatrice Evelyn Mary Saunders, County Organiser, Staffordshire Women's Voluntary Services.
- Ernest Saunders, lately Works Manager, Silvertown Works, Imperial Chemical Industries, Ltd.
- Horace Percival Saunders, Member, National Savings Assembly.
- William Saunders, Inspector of Taxes, Board of Inland Revenue.
- Christine Charlotte Alexandra Savery, Honorary Superintendent, Sandes Home, Royal Air Force, Mildenhall.
- Charles Alexander Scott, lately Chief Cashier, Milk Marketing Board.
- James Scott, District Bread Officer for South-East Scotland.
- John Francis Thomas Scurr, Chief Superintendent, Metropolitan Police.
- Claude Neville Clinton Sebright, Chairman, Chigwell Savings Committee, Essex.
- Percy Sellens, Surveyor, Directorate General of Works, Air Ministry.
- Ellen Shaw. For political and public services in Lancashire.
- Thomas William Sheldrick, Senior Executive Officer, Ministry of National Insurance.
- Garth Leslie Sibbons, Area Officer, South West England, British Council.
- Arnold Frederick Smith, Senior Executive Officer, Ministry of Food.
- Frederick Charles Smith, Senior Executive Officer, Ministry of National Insurance.
- Joseph de Carle Smith. For political and public services in Norfolk.
- Robert Smith, Head Foreman Electrician, Cammell Laird & Company, Ltd., Birkenhead.
- Mary Smyth, Honorary Secretary, Street Savings Group, Belfast.
- Reginald Scott Spring, Steward, H.M. Prison, Wakefield. Dated 17 December 1952 (since deceased).
- Edna Alexandra Stanley, Member, Women's Voluntary Services, Lynton.
- Annie Stevens, Foreign Office.
- John Cromie Patterson Stewart, Staff Officer, National Assistance Board, Northern Ireland.
- Bertram Alfred Wood Stone, M.R.C.S., L.R.C.P., Admiralty Surgeon and Agent, Southsea.
- Cecil Ainsworth Stott, Assistant Master, Aldenham School, Elstree.
- Kathleen Berris Mary Stovell, Senior Executive Officer, London Telecommunications Region, General Post Office.
- Robert Shearer Struthers, Higher Executive Officer, National Assistance Board.
- Norah Sullivan, Senior Experimental Officer, Department of Scientific & Industrial Research.
- Richard Fitzmaurice Sullivan, Chief Officer, Isle of Wight Fire Brigade.
- Charles Joseph Sweeney, Deputy Chief Superintendent, Plans Branch, Land Registry.
- Jessie Mynfreda Sylvester. For political and public services in East Suffolk.
- George Symington, J.P., Scottish Organiser, National Union of Vehicle Builders.
- Josiah Edward Symonds, Registry Clerk, House of Lords.
- Herbert James Tanner, Assistant General Secretary, National Union of Seamen.
- Captain William James Thom, Master, SS Rutland, Currie Line Ltd.
- Ernest Charnock Thomas. For services to ex-servicemen in Birmingham.
- Isabelle Blyth Thomson. For political and public services in Dumfries-shire.
- Frank Thurlow, Executive Officer, Ministry of National Insurance.
- Leonard Ham Tite, Secretary, National Sea Training Schools.
- Cyril Richmond Tobitt, Assistant County Surveyor, Essex County Council.
- Dora Elsie Tonks, lately Superintendent Health Visitor, Wolverhampton County Borough.
- Ralph George Tracy. For services as Chief Clerk, Office of the High Commissioner of the United Kingdom in Canada.
- Edward John Trapnell, Area Secretary, Somerset & Gloucestershire, Electrical Trades Union.
- John William Turner, Secretary, Worsted Spinners Federation.
- Thomas Turner, Senior Executive Officer, Air Ministry.
- Frances May Vale. For political and public services in London and Essex.
- George Anderson Vetch, T.D., Actuary, Lincoln Savings Bank.
- Edith Nora Louise Walker. For political and public services in Wiltshire.
- Helen Marion Wallich, Assistant Secretary, British Empire Leprosy Relief Association.
- Angelica Watson, Member, Nairn County Savings Committee.
- Elizabeth Gunning Watson, Local Fuel Overseer, County of Stirling.
- Wilfrid Watson, Chief Engineer Officer, Trinity House Vessel Ready.
- William Edward Watson, Area Works Manager, S. Smith & Sons (England), Ltd., Cheltenham.
- Hugh Richard Watterson, Chairman and Honorary Secretary, Amlwch Savings Committee, Anglesey.
- Charles James Watts, Chief Draughtsman, Camper & Nicholsons, Ltd., Southampton.
- Ernest John Webb, Chief Technical Officer, Board of Trade.
- Jane Ann Weller, Ward Sister, Fountain Hospital, London.
- Marguerite Jane Weston, Higher Executive Officer, Ministry of National Insurance.
- Sidney Frederick Whitcombe, Senior Executive Officer, Colonial Office.
- Helen Winifred Alice Comine Whitelaw, Housing Convener, Nairn Town Council.
- Frank Geoffrey Whitfield, Chief Executive Officer, Ministry of Supply.
- Frederick John Whittaker, Overseer (Shipwright), on the Staff of the Warship Production Superintendent, Admiralty, Northern Ireland.
- David Rees Williams, J.P., Senior Partner, Williams Brothers, Building & Civil Engineering Contractors, Pontardawe, Swansea.
- James Pascoe Williams, Inspector, India, Pakistan & South East Asia District, Imperial War Graves Commission.
- Owen Williams, Chairman, South-East Glamorgan War Pensions Committee.
- Thomas Wills, Assistant Regional Director, (Lands), Ministry of Works.
- Frederick Walter Wilson, lately Higher Executive Officer, Scottish Home Department.
- William Montgomery Wilson, Senior Executive Officer, Board of Trade.
- Thomas Stafford Wood, Chief Draughtsman, Electrical Department, John Brown & Company, Ltd., Clydebank.
- William Lyle Wood, Pharmacist-in-Charge, Ministry of Pensions.
- Alan Frank Woods, lately Senior Wages Inspector, London & South Eastern Regional Office, Ministry of Labour & National Service.
- Frederick Wooldridge. For services to the British Legion in Cheshire.
- Sidney Wort, Station Officer, War Office Wireless Station.
- Alice May Wright Ellis, Assistant to the Music Librarian, British Broadcasting Corporation.
- Frederick Arthur Wright, Deputy Victualling Store Officer, Admiralty.
- Alderman Robert Yeal, Chairman, Romford & District Disablement Advisory Committee.
- Duncan Drummond Young. For political and public services in the East of Scotland.
- Percy Harold Young, Assistant Revenue Accountant, British Overseas Airways Corporation.

=== Companions of Honour ===
- Edward Morgan Forster, Esq., Writer.

=== British Empire Medal ===
Military Division

- Chief Petty Officer Abdul Wahid bin Haji Mohammed Taib, S/J 16, Royal Malayan Navy.
- Ordnance Artificer, 1st Class Henry William Cantle, D.S.M., C/MX 59277.
- Petty Officer Air Fitter (E) John Thomas Ferbrache, L/SFX 788761.
- Chief Petty Officer Writer Victor John Foakes, C/MX52801.
- Chief Petty Officer Reginald Leonard French, D.S.M., C/JX 137106.
- Chief Petty Officer Steward Percy Garrett, C/L 13771.
- Chief Petty Officer Telegraphist (S) Ronald Alfred Charles Green, P/JX 137587.
- Chief Petty Officer Steward Alfred Joseph Thomas Hodges, D/LX 21203.
- Chief Engine Room Artificer Eric Holbrook, D/MX 60999.
- Sick Berth Chief Petty Officer James William Jack, C/MX 50142.
- Chief Yeoman of Signals Frederick Cotton James, D.S.M., D/JX 132847.
- Aircrewman 1 David Jolliff, L/FX 76366.
- Chief Electrical Artificer Cyril Jordan, D/MX 46981.
- Chief Petty Officer George Henry Charles Lamport, D.S.M., C/JX 133403.
- Chief Engine Room Artificer Roy Walter Frederick Lepage, D.S.M., D/MX 49902.
- Chief Aircraft Artificer Alan Anthony Macleod, L/FX 76928.
- Sergeant Philipp John Margetts, Ply.X 3268, Royal Marines.
- Chief Wren (Regulating) Violet Martin, 2129, Women's Royal Naval Service.
- Chief Petty Officer Telegraphist John Jeffery Maye, P/JX 759112.
- Chief Petty Officer John Norman Leonard Parry Morgan, D/JX 129122.
- Sergeant (C) William John Norris, Po.X 2261, Royal Marines.
- Chief Engine Room Artificer Fleetwood Willingham Ould, D/MX 53034.
- Chief Wren Writer (Pay) Jessie Bridgman Owen, 1473, Women's Royal Naval Service.
- Chief Petty Officer Cook (S) Edwin Walter Charles Sanger, P/MX 48157.
- Regimental Sergeant Major John Patrick Synnott, Ch.X 1675, Royal Marines.
- Chief Petty Officer Norman John Charles Tippett, C/JX 135090.
- Chief Engine Room Artificer Alec George Williams, P/MX 61618.
- Chief Petty Officer Stoker Mechanic Charles Edward Lloyd Willits, TD 827, R.N.V.R.
- Quartermaster Sergeant (C) Hugh Middleton Wilmore, Ply.X 494, Royal Marines.
- No.5771128 Warrant Officer Class II (Acting) Albert Edward Adams, Corps of Royal Electrical & Mechanical Engineers.
- Battery Sergeant-Major Ahmad bin Abdul Hamid, Singapore Royal Artillery.
- No.7883290 Squadron Quartermaster Sergeant David Smith Arbuthnott, 1st/2nd Lothians & Border Horse, Royal Armoured Corps, Territorial Army.
- No.3649751 Sergeant Fred Bagnall, The South Lancashire Regiment (Prince of Wales's Volunteers).
- No.5999317 Corporal (Acting) Fredrick Barrett, The Essex Regiment.
- No.2618565 Colour Sergeant (Acting) Ronald Archibald Boyles, Grenadier Guards.
- No.1095106 Sergeant (Acting) (Artillery Clerk) Thomas Henry Bradshaw, Royal Regiment of Artillery.
- No.22525036 Sergeant (Acting) Robert William Bray, Corps of Royal Electrical & Mechanical Engineers.
- No.S/186311 Warrant Officer Class I (Acting) Norman Brown, Royal Army Service Corps.
- No.2671128 Sergeant (Acting) James Bernard Burke, Corps of Royal Military Police.
- No.22228759 Sergeant Reginald Albert Butler, Intelligence Corps.
- No.T/14485457 Sergeant Clifford Cassell, Royal Army Service Corps.
- No.22225509 Warrant Officer Class II (Acting) Michael De Valera Cavanagh, Royal Army Ordnance Corps.
- No.6837905 Rifleman Bernard Charles Challis, The King's Royal Rifle Corps.
- No.S/209161 Warrant Officer Class II (Acting) Hugh Philip Chapman, Royal Army Service Corps.
- No.S/3531450 Warrant Officer Class II (Acting) Robert Davies, Royal Army Service Corps.
- No.2548526 Staff-Sergeant Raymond Edward James Davis, Corps of Royal Engineers.
- No.NA/173708 Lance-Corporal Usuman Doba, West African Electrical & Mechanical Engineers, Royal West African Frontier Force.
- No.S/3715365 Warrant Officer Class II (Acting) James Donlin, Royal Army Service Corps.
- No.S/21183270 Staff-Sergeant Robert Scott Duncan, Royal Army Service Corps, Territorial Army.
- No.S/14450668 Sergeant Edwin Charles Egelstaff, Royal Army Service Corps.
- No.3654568 Company Quartermaster-Sergeant (Acting) Jack Flaherty, Corps of Royal Military Police.
- No.7265740 Sergeant Peter Gordon Fletcher, Royal Army Medical Corps.
- No.2615542 Sergeant (Acting) William Clement Goodwin, Grenadier Guards.
- No.S/14186657 Staff-Sergeant (Acting) Donald Grime, Royal Army Service Corps.
- No.T/329894 Warrant Officer Class II (Acting) Ronald Arthur Hill, Royal Army Service Corps.
- No.6191644 Sergeant (Artillery Clerk) Richard Charles Holder, Royal Regiment of Artillery, Territorial Army.
- No.5249878 Staff-Sergeant (Artillery Clerk) Alfred George Judge, Royal Regiment of Artillery, Territorial Army.
- No.5836231 Bombardier Thomas Henry King, Royal Regiment of Artillery.
- No.1037888 Battery Quartermaster-Sergeant (Acting) Frank Lane, Royal Regiment of Artillery.
- No.14451565 Corporal Alfred Matthews, Corps of Royal Engineers.
- No.19041610 Sergeant Peter David Molony, Royal Corps of Signals.
- No.NA/70341 Staff Sergeant-Major Nana Gonga, West African Engineers, Royal West African Frontier Force.
- No.N/1700 Bandmaster Shija Nghonge, The King's African Rifles.
- No.21192020 Sergeant Leslie Edwin Peters, Royal Regiment of Artillery.
- No.S/3976588 Warrant Officer Class I (Acting) Warren Kenneth Richardson, Royal Army Service Corps.
- No.7662040 Staff-Sergeant Ronald James Ricketts, Royal Army Pay Corps.
- No.2695381 Colour-Sergeant John Sidney Roe, Scots Guards.
- No.22251646 Sergeant (Acting) Ewart Henry Salmons, Royal Army Ordnance Corps.
- No.S/2584526 Warrant Officer Class II (Acting) George Rippon Seymour, Royal Army Service Corps.
- No.22239614 Sergeant Thomas Rene Spears, Royal Regiment of Artillery, Territorial Army.
- No.781876 Sergeant (Artillery Clerk) (Local Warrant Officer Class II) Geoffrey Frederick Spicer, Royal Regiment of Artillery.
- No.22529813 Staff-Sergeant (Artillery Clerk) James George Stone, Royal Regiment of Artillery, Territorial Army.
- No.6845531 Sergeant Stanley Coyne Tribbick, The King's Royal Rifle Corps.
- No.T/14188745 Sergeant (Acting) Victor Tye, Royal Army Service Corps.
- No.6200447 Sergeant (Vehicle Mechanic) Cecil Leonard Watson, Corps of Royal Electrical & Mechanical Engineers.
- No.843179 Staff-Sergeant (Acting) William Weir, Royal Regiment of Artillery.
- No.14451596 Sergeant Michael Charles Wells, Intelligence Corps.
- No.W/52727 Sergeant Eleanor May Wheeler, Women's Royal Army Corps.
- No.22235941 Corporal Neville Wilson, Corps of Royal Engineers.
- No.963956 Sergeant John Thurkill Wood, Royal Regiment of Artillery.
- 513867 Flight Sergeant Roy Edward Binley, Royal Air Force.
- 516675 Flight Sergeant James Leslie Dixon, Royal Air Force.
- 2697511 Flight Sergeant (now Acting Warrant Officer) Jack Evans, Royal Auxiliary Air Force.
- 564644 Flight Sergeant Frank Gimblett, Royal Air Force.
- 568588 Flight Sergeant James William Hays, Royal Air Force.
- 572177 Flight Sergeant John Stephen Henderson, Royal Air Force.
- 565222 Flight Sergeant Timothy Charles Hiorns, Royal Air Force.
- 560165 Flight Sergeant James Arthur Lock, Royal Air Force.
- 562224 Flight Sergeant (now Acting Warrant Officer) Edgar Whauam Mathers, Royal Air Force.
- 531819 Flight Sergeant John Francis Sheekey, Royal Air Force.
- 565015 Flight Sergeant (Now Acting Warrant Officer) Percy Lloyd Webb, Royal Air Force.
- 520403 Chief Technician William Robert Frank Hawkes, Royal Air Force.
- 518259 Chief Technician Raymond Weilding, Royal Air Force.
- 2032217 Acting Flight Sergeant Margaret Elizabeth Craig, Women's Royal Air Force.
- 2066196 Acting Flight Sergeant Joan Alice Judd, Women's Royal Air Force.
- 591932 Sergeant Donald Arthur Barnett, Royal Air Force.
- 576534 Sergeant Frederick Alexander Edward Chivers, Royal Air Force.
- 1617766 Sergeant Cyril Robert George Finnis, Royal Air Force.
- 3033113 Sergeant John Graham, Royal Air Force.
- 591561 Sergeant Reginald John Grose, Royal Air Force.
- 1827840 Sergeant Donald McDougall, Royal Air Force.
- 1456799 Sergeant Donald Nelson McInnes, Royal Air Force.
- 936168 Sergeant Gilbert Slinger, Royal Air Force.
- 538070 Sergeant John Whitehead, Royal Air Force.
- 643235 Acting Sergeant Ernest Walter Ward, Royal Air Force.
- 985838 Senior Technician Arnold Danby, Royal Air Force.
- 3050510 Corporal Charles Douglas Austin, Royal Air Force.
- 3503504 Corporal Robert Jones, Royal Air Force.
- 1911714 Corporal William Gerard Woods, Royal Air Force.
- 3504480 Acting Corporal Sidney Kay, Royal Air Force.

Civil Division

- Gladys Ainsley, Training Officer, County Durham, Women's Voluntary Services.
- Edith Aitken, Chief Woman Observer, Headquarters, No.38 Group, Aberdeen, Royal Observer Corps.
- Mary Albon, Honorary Collector, Street Savings Group, Bury St. Edmunds.
- Victor Arthur Aldous, Lathe Turner, English Electric Company Ltd., Rugby.
- Percy Allen, Mains Foreman, South Western Electricity Board.
- Samuel Allen, Pump Attendant, East Midlands Division, National Coal Board.
- Frederick Askem, Electrician, Darwins Ltd., Sheffield.
- Caraielo Attard, Principal Foreman, Ordnance Depot, War Office, Malta.
- Richard Scott Baker, Chief Inspector, Regional Director's Office, General Post Office, Birmingham.
- John William Banks, Banksman, Bank Hall Colliery, North-Western Division, National Coal Board.
- Cyril Bassett, Foreman, Rayon Printers Ltd., Treforest, Glamorgan.
- Samuel Molyneux Thomas Beach, Foreman, Ferguson Pailin Ltd., Manchester.
- Ernest Reginald Beecher, Foreman, Victoria & Albert Museum.
- Robert Yetts Bell, Sub-Postmaster, Holy Island, Berwick-on-Tweed.
- Arthur Binns, Carding Overlooker, H.R. Ramsbotham & Company, Bradford.
- Mary Elizabeth Bird, Clothing Officer, Chesterfield, Women's Voluntary Services.
- Thomas Bird, Checkweighman, North Eastern Division, National Coal Board.
- William Bishop, Chief Binder and Repairer, Scottish Record Office.
- Albert Blundy, Foreman, Hydraulic Testing Department, Worthington Simpson, Ltd., Newark.
- William Thomas Booth, Labourer, Beckton Gas Works, North Thames Gas Board.
- Thomas James Boswell, Foreman, S. Allcock & Company Ltd., Redditch.
- George Gilbert Bourne, Process Worker I, Royal Ordnance Factory, Swynnerton.
- Clyndwr Bowes, Turner, Royal Ordnance Factory, Cardiff.
- Samuel Brooks, Deputy, West Midlands Division, National Coal Board.
- Bertie Osmond Bullard, Mechanic-in-Charge, Grade I, Post Office Garage, Gloucester.
- Henry Victor Gerald Burton, Technical Class Instructor, Grade II, Government Training Centres, Southend.
- Martha Byron, Honorary Collector, Croft Lane Savings Group, Whiston, Lancashire.
- Colin Millar Campbell, Chief Inspector, Lancashire Constabulary.
- James Cant, Leading Fireman, Fife Area Fire Brigade.
- Alfred Charles John Carpenter, Foreman Shipwright, J.Samuel White & Company Ltd., Isle of Wight.
- Alice Carpenter, Supervisor, Office Telephones, British Council.
- Maud Mary Carpenter, Honorary Collector, Shelldale Avenue Savings Group, Portslade-by-Sea.
- Andrew Carr, Power House Attendant, East Midlands Division, National Coal Board.
- Margaret Mary Chisholm, Chief Prison Officer (Class II), Duke Street Prison, Glasgow.
- Richard Clarke, Farm Worker, Diseworthy, Leicestershire.
- John Cole, Instructor, Military College of Science, Shrivenham.
- Bernard Corcoran, Process Worker II, Royal Ordnance Factory, Swynnerton.
- Herbert Cowdell, Technician, Class I, Telephone Manager's Office, Nottingham.
- John Thomas Cownley, Machinery Erector, Wm. Foster & Company Ltd., Lincoln.
- George William Cox, School Staff Instructor, Wellington College Combined Cadet Force, Berkshire.
- Cecil Swinburne Davidson, Foreman, British Paints Ltd., Newcastle upon Tyne.
- Charles Bert Day, Colliery Checkweighman, West Midlands Division, National Coal Board.
- David Dick, Surface Worker, Scottish Division, National Coal Board.
- John William Ditchfield, Foreman Bricklayer, Lancashire Steel Corporation Ltd., Warrington.
- Jackson Pringle Dobson, Checkweighman, Northern (Northumberland & Cumberland) Division, National Coal Board.
- Theodore Jonathan Dove, Freight and Baggage Master, No.1 Movement Unit (Embarkation), Royal Air Force, London.
- Frederick William Dowdell, Honorary Collector, Savings Group, Ryde, Isle of Wight.
- Frank Eastwood, Foreman of Signals, Thames Estuary Signal Troop.
- Jack Eccles, Pipelaying Foreman, Water Works Department, Manchester Corporation.
- Gladys Ellis, Chief Supervisor, Head Post Office, Shrewsbury, Shropshire.
- Clifford Ellison, Checkweighman, Durham Division, National Coal Board.
- William Ewart, Foreman Fitter, Harland & Wolff Ltd., Belfast.
- Frederick Henemann Feltwell, District Inspector, Birmingham Gas Undertaking, West Midlands Gas Board.
- William Finch, Special Constable, Coventry City Police Force.
- Cyril Findler, Process Worker III, Royal Ordnance Factory, Swynnerton.
- Sybil Maud Finlay, Women Chief Inspector, Durham County Constabulary.
- John Kaine Fish, Supervisor Instructor, No.6 Radio School, Royal Air Force, Cranwell.
- Janet Duncan Fordyce, Manageress, N.A.A.F.I. Canteen, Hanover, Germany.
- Henry Leslie Foster, Senior Foreman of Storehouses, H.M.Dockyard, Portsmouth.
- William Thomas Foster, Shift Electrician, London Electricity Board, Morden, Surrey.
- Willie Friend, Station Officer, West Riding of Yorkshire Fire Brigade, Skipton.
- Bryan William Gasson, School Staff Instructor, Malvern College Combined Cadet Force.
- George Henry Geary, Engine Fitter, H.M. Dockyard Portsmouth.
- Ernest Gillon, Machine Tool Setter, David Brown Tractors (Engineering) Ltd., Huddersfield.
- Charles Gisborne, Foreman, H.H. Martyn & Company Ltd., Cheltenham.
- Alan Anthony Glennie, Foreman Bricklayer, Battersea Generating Station, London Division, British Electricity Authority.
- George Golding, Foreman, John Lysaght (Bristol Works) Ltd.
- Henry Russell Gray, Foreman Fitter, Sunderland Division, Northern Gas Board.
- William John Gutteridge, Physical Training Instructor, Dunblane School, Perthshire.
- John Harries, J.P., Colliery Checkweigher, South Western Division, National Coal Board.
- Charles Albert Hart, Depot Manager, Lowestoft District, House Coal Distribution (Emergency) Scheme.
- Arthur John Harwood, Turbine Driver, Oxford Generating Station, Southern Division, British Electricity Authority.
- Dorothy Florence Heather, Forewoman, Savings Department, General Post Office.
- Thomas Henderson, General Foreman, Kelty Undertaking, Scottish Gas Board.
- Herbert Walter Hibbert, Senior Machine Shop Foreman, Ross Ltd., London.
- Hilda Mary Hicks, Chief Supervisor, Trunk Exchange, Faraday Building, General Post Office.
- Mary Ann Hitchins, Beamer, Joshua Hoyle & Sons Ltd., Summerseat, Lancashire.
- Joseph Holleworth, Turner, Lee & Hunt Ltd., Nottingham.
- Frank Harold Holt. Lately Personal Messenger to the Chancellor of the Exchequer.
- Reginald Wallace John Hooper, Occupational Supervisor, Bristol Industrial Rehabilitation Unit, Ministry of Labour & National Service.
- Eleanor R. Hull, Member, Women's Voluntary Services, Burton-on-Trent.
- James Irvine, M.M., Inspector, Telephone Manager's Office, Glasgow.
- Rhys Price James, Chargehand, Bridgend Remploy Factory, South Wales.
- Arthur Simpson Jenny, Farm Worker, Barton-on-Humber, Lincolnshire.
- Elizabeth Jones, Sister, West Wales Sanatorium, Llanybyther, Carmarthenshire.
- George Richard Jones, Postman, Head Post Office, Portsmouth.
- Gerard Wilfred Jones, Chief Observer, Royal Observer Corps, Kidwelly, Carmarthenshire.
- Leonard Jones, Travelling Superintendent Gardener, French District, Imperial War Graves Commission.
- Morgan Jones, Pumpsman, South Western Division, National Coal Board.
- Charles Henry Knoyle, Senior Artificer, National Physical Laboratory.
- Ernest Harold Lane, Assistant Inspector, Head Post Office, Ascot.
- Sidney John Lee, Chief Bedroom Steward, MV Highland Monarch, Royal Mail Lines, Ltd.
- Edwin James Legg, Stores Superintendent, Central Ordnance Depot, Chilwell.
- Percy Lewis, Shift Substation Attendant, Merseyside & North Wales Electricity Board.
- Frederick Lloyd, Works Foreman, Wales Gas Board, Wrexham.
- Albert Logan, Stoneman (Pieceworker), Durham Division, National Coal Board.
- James Stirratt McArthur, Foreman Linesman, Birmingham Transmission Section, Midlands Division, British Electricity Authority.
- James Gerald Mccarthy, Chargehand, Royal Ordnance Factories, Woolwich.
- James McCracken, Baths Superintendent, Scottish Division, National Coal Board, Kirkintilloch.
- Marion McDermid, Supervisor, Post Office Telephone Exchange, Motherwell.
- Angus Kenneth Macdonald, Assistant Production Inspector, Royal Arsenal, Woolwich.
- Robert McIntosh, Maintenance Shop Foreman, Anderson Boyes & Company Ltd., Motherwell.
- Elizabeth McInyyre, Commandant, Stirling No.26 Detachment, British Red Cross Society.
- John Finlayson Macintyre, Head Forester, Forestry Commission, Scotland.
- Edward William Anderson Malcolm, Warrant Officer, Sherwood Foresters Army Cadet Force.
- Peter Marks, Deck Mechanic, MV Rangitiki, New Zealand Shipping Company Ltd.
- John Martin, J.P., Signalman, Mistley, Eastern Region, Railway Executive.
- Herbert Walter Matthews, Lately Assistant Head Warder, National Maritime Museum.
- William Mawdsley, Hand-Borer, West Coast Tanneries Ltd., Haverigg, Cumberland.
- Herbert Mitchell, Second Leading Hand, Trevol Rifle Range, Torpoint, Cornwall.
- William Ewen Mitchell, Technician, Marston Excelsior Ltd., Wolverhampton.
- Bukare Moshi, D.C.M., M.M., Curator, Gold Coast Regiment Museum, Ashanti.
- Alfred Edward Moulder. Lately Senior Messenger-in-Charge, General Register and Record Office of Shipping and Seamen, Cardiff.
- Marion Neal, Superintendent, Dr. Barnardo's Reception Centre, Hallow Park, Worcester.
- Moi Fat Ng, Carpenter, H.M. Dockyard, Hong Kong.
- Sidney Herbert Norman, Foreman Plate Layer, Guest Keen Baldwins Iron & Steel Company Ltd., Cardiff.
- Henry Page, Greaser, SS Otranto, Orient Steam Navigation Company Ltd.
- Pauline Ivy Palmer, Honorary Collector, Somerset Road No.1 Savings Group, Coventry.
- Leslie George Alfred Parker, Chief Petty Officer Instructor, Arbroath Unit Sea Cadet Corps.
- George Peters, Foreman, Premo Rubber Company Ltd., Petersfield.
- Irene Pickup, Production Assistant, Rowntree & Company Ltd., York.
- Howard Dafydd Edgar Pierce, Foreman, Fine Leather Goods Department, T.J.& J.Smith Ltd., Ilford, Essex.
- Albert Platt, Safety Officer, North Western Division, National Coal Board.
- Albert Edward Potter, Locomotive Driver, London District, Western Region, Railway Executive.
- Walter John Potter, General Foreman, Ramsgate Works, South Eastern Gas Board.
- Eliza Kate Price, Head Cook, Osborne House, Isle of Wight.
- Harry George Pritchard, Superintendent, British Museum.
- William Prosser. For services to the blind in West Ham.
- Edward Radford, Coal Face Worker, South Eastern Division, National Coal Board.
- Marjorie Reed, Honorary Collector, Street Savings Group, London, W.1.
- Sophie Reed, Centre Organiser, Docking Rural District, Women's Voluntary Services.
- Helen Sinclair Reid, Supervisor, Meals on Wheels Service, Edinburgh, Women's Voluntary Services.
- Doris Rendell, Centre Organiser, Axbridge, Women's Voluntary Services.
- Frederick George Reynolds, Designer, Vanners & Fennell Brothers Ltd.
- Jesse Rhodes, Yard Foreman, Leeds, North Eastern Division, Docks & Inland Waterways.
- Jessie Florence Rivett, Supervisor of Cleaners, Ministry of Labour & National Service.
- Leonard Hector Robinson, Foreman of Trades III, Ministry of Civil Aviation.
- Leonard Rooks, Wood Working Machinist, No.4 Maintenance Unit, R.A.F., Ruislip.
- Arthur Rowland, General Foreman, Sims, Sons & Cooke, Nottingham.
- John William Royle, Chargehand, Leyland Motors Ltd., Preston.
- Harold Frederick Russon, Station Engineer II, Air Ministry, York.
- Benjamin Salt, Dipper, A.B. Jones & Sons, Stoke-on-Trent.
- Robert Albert John Savage, Carpenter and Charge Hand, Radio Research Station, Department of Scientific & Industrial Research, Dachet.
- William Albert Sawden, Principal Instructor, H.M. Borstal Institution, Feltham.
- Arthur Scott, Mainlaying Inspector, Nottingham Undertaking, East Midlands Gas Board.
- Page William Sharp, Factory Supervisor, Fisher's Foils Ltd., Wembley.
- Robert Levi Shephard, Factory Foreman, S. Ward, Ltd., Birmingham.
- Marjorie Simmons, Centre Organiser, Haltemprice North, Women's Voluntary Services.
- James Walter Smith, Principal Keeper, Cromer Lighthouse, Norfolk.
- Stanley George Smith, Assistant (Scientific), Royal Naval College, Greenwich.
- Ernest William Sparling, Decorating Supervisor, Marshall Andrew & Company Ltd., London.
- John Phillip Spears, Plate Shop Superintendent, Aveling-Barford Ltd., Grantham.
- Samuel Stephens, Station Warden, Royal Air Force, Kinloss.
- Blanche Stephenson, Honorary Collector, Street Savings Groups, Wath-on-Dearne, Yorkshire.
- John Straughton, Telephonist and Switchboard Operator, Workington Branch, United Steel Company Ltd.
- Alexander Stronge, Construction Foreman, Electricity Board for Northern Ireland.
- Laurence Timothy Sullivan, Foreman, Mullard, Blackburn Works, Ltd., Blackburn.
- Marion Sykes, Senior Chief Supervisor, Manchester Trunk & Toll Exchange, Salford.
- Robert Symons, Head Gardener, North-West European District, Imperial War Graves Commission.
- Edward Tetlow, Inspector, Dudley County Borough Police Force.
- Bessie McLean Thom, Assistant Supervisor, Post Office Telephone Exchange, Perth.
- John Thomas, Stoker Instructor, Ministry of Works, Cambridge.
- Ernest Wellington Thompson, Chargehand Carpenter, War Department, Jamaica.
- John Thompson, Fireman, SS Rathlin, Clyde Shipping Company Ltd., Glasgow.
- Hubert Victor Thorpe, Station Officer, Hertfordshire Fire Brigade, St. Albans.
- Cyril Ugalde Trask, Foreman of Works, H.M. Prison, Dartmoor.
- Russell Tribe, Inspector, Southampton Police Force.
- David Uren, Member, St.Ives Company, Coast Life Saving Corps.
- Giovanni Vella, Inspector of Police, H.M. Dockyard, Malta.
- Alexander Walker, Warden, Territorial Army Centre, Glasgow.
- James Walker, Installation Inspector, Fife Sub-Area, South East Scotland Electricity Board.
- David Anderson Wallace, Superintending Foreman, Dumfries Factory, Imperial Chemical Industries Ltd.
- Andrew Collins Weddell, Foreman, William Thyne Ltd., Edinburgh.
- Harold White, Chargehand, Wakefield Gas Undertaking, North Eastern Gas Board.
- John Henry Whiteley, Principal Workshop Foreman, 26 Command Workshops, R.E.M.E., Stirling.
- William Robert Whitlock, Chief Fettler, Bristol Foundry Company.
- Robert Wight, Shepherd, Elvanfoot, Lanarkshire.
- George Willie Wildman, Boiler House Foreman, Greenhill Generating Station, North Western Division, British Electricity Authority.
- Herbert Howard Wilkins, Postman, Higher Grade, Head Post Office, Trowbridge.
- Elizabeth Anne Wilkinson, Supervisor, George W. Homer & Company Ltd., Chester-le-Street, Co. Durham.
- William Alderson Wilkinson, Foreman-in-Charge, Scotswood Factory, Darlington Insulation Company Ltd.
- Percy Williams, Chargehand Fitter, Charles D. Holmes & Company Ltd., Hull.
- Samuel John Williams, Head Messenger, Office of the High Commissioner for the United Kingdom in the Union of South Africa.
- Andrew Wilson, Boatswain, SS Bengore Head, G. Heyn & Sons Ltd., Islandmagee, Co. Antrim.
- Edward Wilson, Stone Duster, Northern (Northumberland & Cumberland) Division, National Coal Board.
- William Wilson. Lately Sergeant, Royal Ulster Constabulary.
- Stanley William Alfred Wood, Barrack Inventory Accountant, War Office, Gibraltar.
- Arthur Wright, Coal Miner, North Eastern Division, National Coal Board.
- Constance Olive Wright, Sub-Postmistress, Sheen Road Town Sub-Office, Richmond, Surrey.
- John Arthur Wright, Outdoor Officer and Supervisor, Borstal Division, Central After Care Association, London.
- Thomas Yeomans, Surgeryman Chargehand, Royal Aircraft Establishment, Ministry of Supply.
- Frank Edward Young, D.S.M., Postman, Higher Grade, London Postal Region.
- Sergeant Gargwe, Head Messenger, Chief Native Commissioner's Office, Salisbury, Southern Rhodesia.
- Joas Ntsukunyane, Mission School Teacher, Basutoland.
- James Samuel Giragosian, Veterinary Inspector, Class II, Agricultural Department, Cyprus.
- Pollis Michael Mouzouris, Mukhtar of Kilani, Cyprus.
- Robert Aheto Quarshie, Chief Warder, Prison Department, Gold Coast.
- So Sing Woon, Postal Clerk, Grade 1, Hong Kong.
- Kasina son of Ndoo, Government Chief, Migwani Location, Kitui District, Kenya.
- Gideon Magak, Special Grade Chief, Kasipul Location, South Nyanza, Kenya.
- Joel Meshak Omino, Secretary to the Central Nyanza African District Council, Kenya.
- Abdul Mutalib bin Ja'afar, Senior Technical Assistant, Special Grade, Telecommunications Department, Johore Bahru, Federation of Malaya.
- Edward Alexander Augustine, Locomotive Driver, Malayan Railway, Federation of Malaya.
- Mangalath Balan, Senior Anti-Malarial Inspector, Health Department, Federation of Malaya.
- Boey Kam Hong, Assistant Registrar of Criminals, Criminal Registry, C.I.D. Headquarters, Federation of Malaya.
- Check Foon Ho, Health Sister, Jelebu, Federation of Malaya.
- Mahmud bin Ali, Forest Ranger, Special Grade, Forest School, Kepong, Federation of Malaya.
- Tan Siew-Fun, Technical Cadet, Survey Department, Johore, Federation of Malaya.
- V. Coomarasamy, Confidential Clerk, Service Branch, Federation of Malaya.
- Mohamed Zain bin Mohamed Nordin, Outdoor Officer, Special Grade, Federation of Malaya.
- Goh Eng Koon, Chief Clerk, Police Depot, Federation of Malaya.
- Avin Horace Earnest Keun, Locomotive Driver, Malayan Railway, Federation of Malaya.
- Lim Thian Peng, Junior Civil Liaison Officer, Federation of Malaya.
- Mohamed Yusof bin Mohamed Aris, Technical Assistant, Special Grade, Federation of Malaya.
- Chan Wooi Mooi, Chief Clerk, Police H.Q., Perak, Federation of Malaya.
- Arunasalam Thillaiampalam Arumugham, Chief Clerk, Labour Department, Johore, Federation of Malaya.
- Inche Abdul Rahman bin Rasib, Lately Agricultural Subordinate, Coconut Station, Port Swettenham, Federation of Malaya.
- Lau Sing Nam, Agricultural Assistant, Selangor, Federation of Malaya.
- Yong Chin Ean, Special Grade Police Clerk and Interpreter, Special Branch Headquarters, Seremiban, Federation of Malaya.
- Ganapathipillai Nallathamby, Special Grade Technical Assistant, Survey Department, Federation of Malaya.
- Lim Beng Swee, Special Grade Clerk and Interpreter, Raub District, Federation of Malaya.
- Ramburram Jagesar, Shore Boatswain, Harbour & Quays Department, Mauritius.
- Antagai bin Tuayan, Village Headman, Kampang, Simanggulu, North Borneo.
- Haji Aden Elmi, Local Authority, Habr Yunis Tribe, Somaliland.
- Haji Mohamed Mohamoud, Somali Assistant (Interpreter), Somaliland.
- Kapere bin Kapufi Ntinda Nyente, Chief of Nkansi, Ufipa District, Tanganyika.
- Dunstan James Jack Madundo, Lately Clerk, Grade I, Junior Service, Tanganyika.
- Suleman Khalfani, Lately Telegraphist, Special Grade, Posts & Telegraphs Department, East Africa High Commission.

=== Royal Victorian Medal ===
- Reginald George Barnett.
- James Garrett.
- Police Constable George Knight, Metropolitan Police.
- Frank William Henry Lewis.
- Police Constable George Stone, Metropolitan Police.
- Thomas Sweet.
- Inspector Alexander Usher, Metropolitan Police.
- Chief Petty Officer Steward Emmanuel Zahra, LX 21160.

=== Queen's Commendation for Valuable Service in the Air ===
- Captain Alistair Michael Adair Majendie, Flight Captain, Comet Fleet, British Overseas Airways Corporation.
- Captain Ernest Edward Rodley, D.S.O., D.F.C., A.F.C., Officer-in-Charge, Training, Comet Fleet, British Overseas Airways Corporation.
- Wing Commander Leonard Edgar Giles, O.B.E., D.F.C., A.F.C. (42213), Royal Air Force.
- Wing Commander James Donald Wakefield Willis, A.F.C. (44972), Royal Air Force.
- Squadron Leader John Hanbury Smith-Carington (123467), Royal Air Force.
- Squadron Leader Christopher Gordon Clark, D.F.C. (109031), Royal Air Force (deceased).
- Squadron Leader Terence Helper, D.F.C. (127041), Royal Air Force.
- Squadron Leader John Rayson, A.F.C. (49876), Royal Air Force.
- Squadron Leader Alexander Robertson Wilson, D.S.O. (61511), Royal Air Force.
- Acting Squadron Leader Frank Clifford Ellis (125937), Royal Air Force.
- Acting Squadron Leader Clifford Laurence Godwin (153112), Royal Air Force.
- Flight Lieutenant Peter Portway Baker (57528), Royal Air Force.
- Flight Lieutenant John Beaumont Blackett (145860), Royal Air Force.
- Flight Lieutenant Leonard Charles Boys (55401), Royal Air Force.
- Flight Lieutenant Philip Cherry (172458), Royal Air Force.
- Flight Lieutenant Timothy William Fane De Salis (58130), Royal Air Force.
- Flight Lieutenant Edmond Augustus Devillez (59583), Royal Air Force.
- Flight Lieutenant Albert Alan Fenn (115738), Royal Air Force.
- Flight Lieutenant Gerald Gray (178969), Royal Air Force.
- Flight Lieutenant Harold Clifford Hoover, D.F.C. (59439), Royal Air Force.
- Flight Lieutenant Graham Stanway Hulse, D.F.C (52935), Royal Air Force.
- Flight Lieutenant Ronald Charles Norris (186937), Royal Air Force.
- Flight Lieutenant John Stanley Owen (55296), Royal Air Force.
- Flight Lieutenant Raimund Puda (69458), Royal Air Force.
- Flight Lieutenant Richard David Richards (158109), Royal Air Force.
- Flight Lieutenant Douglas William Wyndham Sutton, D.F.C. (174577), Royal Air Force.
- Flight Lieutenant Donald Roe West, D.F.C. (42087), Royal Air Force.
- Flight Lieutenant Norman Westby, D.F.C. (177634), Royal Air Force.
- Flight Lieutenant John Robert Wilcock (195970), Royal Air Force.
- Flight Lieutenant Rodney John Arthur Woods (181184), Royal Air Force.
- Flight Lieutenant John Frederick William Yates, D.F.C. (52163), Royal Air Force.
- Acting Flight Lieutenant Robert William Harry Goodrum, D.F.C. (185228), Royal Auxiliary Air Force.
- Flying Officer Arthur Oliver Sharples (968370), Royal Air Force.
- Flying Officer Jindrich Skirka (145003), Royal Air Force.
- Pilot Officer Malcolm Geoffrey Roe (4069201), Royal Air Force.
- Master Navigator Bernard Weller, D.F.C. (1165351), Royal Air Force.
- Master Signaller James Rennie (645357), Royal Air Force.
- Master Signaller Dennis Harold Smith (553911), Royal Air Force.
- 1339795 Flight Sergeant John Richard Banbury, Royal Air Force.
- 576379 Flight Sergeant Roy Norman Britton, Royal Air Force.
- 575205 Flight Sergeant Raymond George Flower, Royal Air Force.
- 1387472 Flight Sergeant Richard Livermore, Royal Air Force.
- 1603850 Flight Sergeant John Stafford Loomes, Royal Air Force.
- 1349433 Flight Sergeant Alexander Melville McKelvie, Royal Air Force.
- 1576317 Flight Sergeant Douglas Leonard Manton, Royal Air Force.
- 1321774 Flight Sergeant Brian Anthony O'Callaghan, Royal Air Force.
- 1335743 Flight Sergeant Douglas Verdun Oram, Royal Air Force.
- 1584627 Sergeant Leslie John Bristlin, Royal Air Force.
- 1607244 Sergeant Leslie Walker Forster, Royal Air Force.

=== Royal Red Cross ===
- Major Margery Florence Mallett (206313), Queen Alexandra's Royal Army Nursing Corps.
- Major Irene Isabella Scruton (206465), Queen Alexandra's Royal Army Nursing Corps.
- Wing Officer Mary Ross Gall, A.R.R.C. (5057), Princess Mary's Royal Air Force Nursing Service.
- Her Royal Highness The Princess Royal, C.I., G.C.V.O., G.B.E., Air Chief Commandant, Princess Mary's Royal Air Force Nursing Service.

=== Associate Royal Red Cross ===
- Bridget Dorothea Harvey, Superintending Sister, Queen Alexandra's Royal Naval Nursing Service.
- Dorothy Adie Stoy, Superintending Sister, Queen Alexandra's Royal Naval Nursing Service.
- Captain Ethel Marion Scott (209256), Queen Alexandra's Royal Army Nursing Corps.
- Flight Officer Jane Elizabeth Daly (5506), Princess Mary's Royal Air Force Nursing Service.

=== Air Force Cross & Bar ===
- Squadron Leader James Stewart Higgins, D.F.C., A.F.C. (44680), Royal Air Force.

=== Air Force Cross ===
- Wing Commander Hubert Patrick Connolly, D.F.C., A.F.M. (44636), Royal Air Force.
- Wing Commander Wilfrid Allen Lance Davis, D.F.C. (37315), Royal Air Force.
- Wing Commander Peter Prosser Hanks, D.S.O., D.F.C. (37351), Royal Air Force.
- Wing Commander Albert Norman Jones (37503), Royal Air Force.
- Acting Wing Commander Kenneth William Mackenzie, D.F.C. (84017), Royal Air Force.
- Acting Wing Commander John Lewis Mitchell, M.V.O., D.F.C. (78986), Royal Air Force.
- Acting Wing Commander Peter Guy Ottewill, G.M. (46451), Royal Air Force.
- Squadron Leader Ian Desmond Bourne (108164), Royal Air Force.
- Squadron Leader John Crampton, D.F.C. (131910), Royal Air Force.
- Squadron Leader Loudon Lorraine Doveton (59355), Royal Air Force.
- Squadron Leader Hugh Grant (67668), Royal Air Force.
- Squadron Leader James Gordon Harrison (50494), Royal Air Force.
- Squadron Leader Robert Milham Horsley, D.F.C. (120849), Royal Air Force.
- Squadron Leader Bernard James Jennings, D.F.M. (47706), Royal Air Force.
- Squadron Leader Christopher Cecil McCarthy-Jones (91312), Royal Auxiliary Air Force.
- Squadron Leader Patrick Ascension Kennedy, D.S.O., D.F.C. (122141), Royal Air Force.
- Squadron Leader John Pierrepont Meadows, D.F.C. (82672), Royal Auxiliary Air Force.
- Squadron Leader Rex Southern Sanders, D.F.C. (135043), Royal Air Force.
- Squadron Leader Richard Gordon Wakeford (133508), Royal Air Force.
- Acting Squadron Leader Donald Matthew Clause (137408), Royal Air Force.
- Acting Squadron Leader Owen Leslie Hardy, D.F.C. (59622), Royal Air Force.
- Acting Squadron Leader Ronald Albert Harvey (55037), Royal Air Force.
- Flight Lieutenant Anthony William Wheldon Atkinson (193431), Royal Air Force.
- Flight Lieutenant James Gerard Brodie (189396), Royal Air Force.
- Flight Lieutenant David Carlson (59808), Royal Air Force Reserve of Officers.
- Flight Lieutenant Graham Ian Chapman (174421), Royal Air Force.
- Flight Lieutenant Albert Hart Crowe, D.F.C. (47040), Royal Air Force.
- Flight Lieutenant John Edward Davidson, D.F.C. (56092), Royal Air Force.
- Flight Lieutenant Ronald Vivian Ecclestone, D.F.C. (175308), Royal Air Force.
- Flight Lieutenant Ronald Cyril Everson (52030), Royal Air Force.
- Flight Lieutenant Watson Walter Forster (120188), Royal Air Force.
- Flight Lieutenant Alan Dorrington Gibson, D.F.M. (59600), Royal Air Force Reserve of Officers.
- Flight Lieutenant Walter Edward Frank Gray (153361), Royal Air Force.
- Flight Lieutenant Leszek Kazimierz Grzybowski (500414), Royal Air Force.
- Flight Lieutenant Timothy Devenish Lamb (196894), Royal Air Force.
- Flight Lieutenant Miroslav Antonin Liskutin, D.F.C. (158235), Royal Air Force.
- Flight Lieutenant Miloslav Jan Mansfeld, D.S.O., D.F.C. (69453), Royal Air Force.
- Flight Lieutenant Maurice James George Morley (58723), Royal Air Force.
- Flight Lieutenant William Walton Saunders (48572), Royal Air Force.
- Flight Lieutenant Ronald James Scammell, D.F.C. (173784), Royal Air Force.
- Flight Lieutenant Peter Howard Langston Scott (180447), Royal Air Force.
- Flight Lieutenant Geoffrey Rutherford Walker (58013), Royal Air Force.
- Flight Lieutenant David Rutherford Ware, D.F.C. (169023), Royal Air Force.
- Flight Lieutenant John William Pascoe-Watson (3038489), Royal Air Force Reserve of Officers.
- Flight Lieutenant Harold Paston-Williams (83930), Royal Air Force.
- Flying Officer John Francis Bernard Delany (1867264), Royal Air Force.
- Flying Officer George Henry Farley (178717), Royal Air Force.
- Flying Officer Francis Joseph Harrison (519943), Royal Air Force.
- Flying Officer Laurence Desmond Hickey (1796248), Royal Air Force.
- Master Engineer John Craig Thom (973767), Royal Air Force.
- Master Signaller Frederick William Walker (550392), Royal Air Force.
- Commander (E) Kenneth Roy Hickson, Royal Navy.

=== Air Force Medal ===
- 1580293 Flight Sergeant William Herbert Atkins, Royal Air Force.
- 576041 Flight Sergeant Walter Forster, Royal Air Force.
- 1892659 Flight Sergeant Desmond Patrick Hutchinson, Royal Air Force.
- 1606035 Flight Sergeant James Law, Royal Air Force.
- 1590142 Flight Sergeant Frank Lightowler, Royal Air Force.
- 996594 Flight Sergeant Archibald William MacDonald, Royal Air Force.
- 920837 Flight Sergeant (now Master Pilot) Raymond Mills, Royal Air Force.
- 1077386 Flight Sergeant Sinclair O'Connor, Royal Air Force.
- 1672022 Flight Sergeant Lawrence Eric Powell, Royal Air Force.
- 1803658 Flight Sergeant Charles Francis Roper, Royal Air Force.
- 787170 Flight Sergeant Karel Stastny, Royal Air Force.
- 1323638 Flight Sergeant Edward James Treeves, Royal Air Force.
- 579501 Sergeant Albert Hildred, Royal Air Force.
- 3077326 Sergeant William Alexander Lindsay, Royal Air Force.
- 3113931 Sergeant Kenneth Maynard Marwood, Royal Air Force.
- 987835 Robert Raeburn Robertson, Royal Air Force.

=== King's Police and Fire Services Medal (KPM) ===
Police-England and Wales

- Thomas Mark Watson, O.B.E., Chief Constable, Walsall Borough Police Force.
- Lieutenant-Colonel Harold Mighall, Chief Constable, Southport Borough Police Force.
- Charles George Box, O.B.E.., Chief Constable, Southampton Borough Police Force.
- Ranulph Robert Maunsell Bacon, Chief Constable, Devon Constabulary.
- Lieutenant-Colonel Ronald Berry Greenwood, Assistant Chief Constable, Lincolnshire Constabulary.
- Arthur Iveson, Superintendent and Deputy Chief Constable, Dewsbury Borough Police Force.
- Reginald Baden Mitchell, Superintendent, Norfolk Constabulary.
- Thomas Lockley, Detective Chief- Superintendent, Staffordshire Constabulary.
- Richard Thomas Lyons, Superintendent, Glamorgan Constabulary.
- Frederick Rupert Cherrill, M.B.E., Chief Superintendent, Metropolitan Police.
- James Duguid Duncan, Chief Superintendent, Metropolitan Police.
- Frederick Francis Robinson, M.M., Superintendent, Metropolitan Police.

Police-Scotland

- William Paterson, Chief Constable, Inverness Burgh Police Force.
- George Herbert Rutherford Campbell Docherty, Superintendent, Lanarkshire Constabulary.

Police-Northern Ireland

- Andrew Fulton, Head Constable, Royal Ulster Constabulary.

Fire Service-England and Wales

- Thomas Herbert Patrick, O.B.E., Chief Officer, Leicestershire and Rutland Fire Brigade.
- Errington McKinnell, O.B.E., Chief Officer, City of Leicester Fire Brigade.
- Charles Birch, O.B.E., Chief Officer, Brighton Fire Brigade.
- John William Herbert Strange, Chief Officer, Flintshire Fire Brigade.
- Charles Tozer, Assistant Chief Officer, Durham Fire Brigade.

Australia

- Peter John Martin, Superintendent 3rd Class, New South Wales Police Force.
- Edmund Anthony Kinsela, Superintendent 3rd Class, New South Wales Police Force.
- John William Swasbrick, Superintendent 3rd Class, New South Wales Police Force.
- Arthur Leslie Nye, Superintendent 3rd Class, New South Wales Police Force.
- Joseph Clifford Morris, Inspector 1st Class, New South Wales Police Force.
- John Vernon Hayes, Inspector 1st Class, New South Wales Police Force.

Southern Rhodesia

- Brigadier James Appleby, Commissioner of the British South Africa Police.

Colonies, Protectorates and Protected States

- Jocelyn Maingard, M.B.E., Police Medical Officer and Superintendent, Mauritius Police Force.
- William Michael Gambier Sandwith, C.P.M., Senior Superintendent of Police, Kenya.
- Bachan Singh, C.P.M., Chief Inspector (Asian) of Police, Kenya.
- Frederick Barnaby Carter, Assistant Commissioner of Police, Cyprus.
- John Ventry Mullin, C.P.M., Assistant Commissioner of Police, Uganda.
- Thomas Quartas Gaffikin, Chief Police Officer, Federation of Malaya.
- Henry John Barnard, Chief Police Officer, Federation of Malaya.

=== Colonial Police Medal ===
- Major Ernest Hope Bunce, British South Africa Police.
- James Leslie Christie, Chief Inspector, British South Africa Police.
- Dokotera, Detective Station Sergeant, British South Africa Police.
- Sidney Drewett, Chief Inspector, British South Africa Police.
- Harry, Detective Corporal, British South Africa Police.
- Marisi, First Class Sergeant, British South Africa Police.
- Natende, Second Class Sergeant, British South Africa Police.
- Captain Joseph Robert Newton, British South Africa Police.
- Abdi son of Sheikh Abubakar, Assistant Inspector, Kenya Police Force.
- Mustafa Ali, Lately District Sergeant Major, Cyprus Police Force.
- Alias bin Odein, Lance Corporal, Federation of Malaya Police Force.
- Albert Gardner Ames, Superintendent, Gold Coast Police Force.
- Lawrence Kwami Ametepe, Inspector, Gold Coast Police Force.
- Anderson, Detective Constable, Northern Rhodesia Police Force.
- Sydney Aloysius Anderson, Assistant Superintendent, Jamaica Constabulary.
- Atan bin Ah, Sergeant Major, Federation of Malaya Police Force.
- Joseph Odoteye Attokro, Chief Inspector, Gold Coast Police Force.
- Jack Barlow, B.E.M., Assistant Superintendent, Federation of Malaya Police Force.
- Alfred James Augustus Blake, Assistant Superintendent, Federation of Malaya Police Force.
- Frederick Charles Brookes, Senior Superintendent, Kenya Police Force.
- Roy Leslie Carter, Honorary Inspector, Auxiliary. Police, Federation of Malaya.
- Ronald Angus Coles, Honorary Inspector, Auxiliary Police, Federation of Malaya.
- Senchie Dagarti, Sergeant, Gold Coast Police Force.
- Edmund Joseph Doxat, Superintendent, Gold Coast Police Force.
- Athelstan Constantine Folkes, Assistant Superintendent, Jamaica Constabulary.
- Alfred James Francis, Assistant Superintendent, Northern Rhodesia Police Force.
- Abdul Ghani bin Mat Asi, Inspector, Federation of Malaya Police Force.
- Albert Cecil Good, Assistant Superintendent, Singapore Police Force.
- Patrick Abbott Gouldsbury, Assistant Superintendent, Federation of Malaya Police Force.
- Dennis James Hargreaves, Assistant Superintendent, Federation of Malaya Police Force.
- Haron bin Hassan, Assistant Superintendent, Federation of Malaya Police Force.
- H'ng Soon Poh, Senior Inspector, Federation of Malaya Police Force.
- Silvanus Hodgson, Assistant Superintendent, Federation of Malaya Police Force.
- Nicholas Yevugah Hossoo, Inspector, Gold Coast Police Force.
- Ibrahim bin Mohamed Mohaidin, Assistant Superintendent, Federation of Malaya Police Force.
- Ismail bin Mohamed Said, Corporal, Federation of Malaya Police Force.
- Katiku son of Ikuta, Sergeant, Kenya Police Force.
- Khan Sahib Mohamed Khan Rangbaz Khan, M.B.E., Assistant Superintendent, Aden Police Force.
- Stanley Thomas John Kirby, Police Lieutenant, Federation of Malaya Police Force.
- Apostplos Kyprianou, Chief Inspector, Cyprus Police Force.
- Sulley Lagos, Sergeant, Gold Coast- Police Force.
- Lam Ming Poh, Inspector, Singapore Police Force.
- Kenneth James Larby, Superintendent, Federation of Malaya Police Force.
- Frederick Owen Lewis, Assistant Superintendent, Federation of Malaya Police Force.
- Clive Little, Honorary Assistant Superintendent, Auxiliary Police, Federation of Malaya.
- Musa Lobi, Sergeant, Gold Coast Police Force.
- Roy Bickerton Lyon, Reserve Police Officer, Kenya Police Reserve.
- Abdul Manaf bin Lembang, Acting Sergeant, Federation of Malaya Police Force.
- Francis Dennett Marrable, Superintendent, Federation of Malaya Police Force.
- Mat bin Puasa, Lance Sergeant, Federation of Malaya Police Force.
- Loti Mtalika, Inspector, Northern Rhodesia Police Force.
- Ng Khin Yee, Assistant Superintendent, Federation of Malaya Police Force.
- Eric Kilburn Norgate, Assistant Superintendent, Federation of Malaya Police Force.
- Gerald Ernest Hadden Payee, Assistant Superintendent, Federation of Malaya Police Force.
- Mehmet Refik, Assistant Superintendent, Cyprus Police Force.
- Anthony Peter Rice, Assistant Superintendent, Federation of Malaya Police Force.
- Lieutenant-Colonel Cuthbert Frank Hurry-Riches, Honorary Inspector, Auxiliary Police, Federation of Malaya.
- Claudius Matthias Roberts, Assistant Superintendent, Dominica Police Force.
- Frederick Alexander Roberts, Assistant Superintendent, Northern Rhodesia Police Force.
- Harvey Theodore Blackburne Ryves, Superintendent, Federation of Malaya Police Force.
- David John Sale, Superintendent, Aden Police Force.
- Lancelot Alban Searle, Superintendent, Federation of Malaya Police Force.
- Mohamed Sharif bin Mohamed, Assistant Superintendent, Federation of Malaya Police Force.
- Pritam Singh, Assistant Superintendent, Federation of Malaya Police Force.
- Sui Hui Min, Detective Sergeant, Singapore Police Force.
- Adrian Dickenson Ripley Varcoe, Police Lieutenant, Federation of Malaya Police Force.
- George Baskerville Viveash, Superintendent, Cyprus Police Force.
- Ronald Percy. Wells, Police Lieutenant, Federation of Malaya Police Force.
- Patrick Whiteing, Acting Senior Superintendent, Kenya Police Force.
- Charles William Wright, Assistant Superintendent, Federation of Malaya Police Force

== Australia ==
Honours conferred on the advice of Her Majesty's Australian Ministers.

=== Knight Bachelor ===
- Norman McAlister Gregg, Esq., M.C., M.B., F.R.A.C.S. For services to Medical Science.
- Martin McIlrath, Esq. For public and philanthropic services. Dated 12 December 1952. (since deceased).
- Horace Frank Richardson, Esq. For public services.

=== Order of the Bath ===
==== Companion (CB) ====
Military Division

- Major-General Frank Kingsley Norris, C.B.E., D.S.O., E.D. (3/40000), Director-General of Medical Services, Australian Military Forces.

=== Order of St Michael and St George ===
==== Knight Commander (KCMG) ====
- The Honourable Philip Albert Martin McBride, Minister for Defence.

==== Companion (CMG) ====
- Harold Alfred Maurice Campbell, Esq. For services to journalism in Australia.

=== Order of the British Empire ===
==== Knight Commander (KBE) ====
Military Division

- Air Marshal George Jones, C.B., C.B.E., D.F.C., Royal Australian Air Force.

Civil Division

- The Honourable Colin Archibald Sinclair, a prominent grazier and pastoralist. For public services.

==== Commander (CBE) ====
Military Division

- Captain Roy Russell Dowling, D.S.O., Royal Australian Navy.
- Brigadier Hugh George Harlock (3/47), Australian Staff Corps.
- Acting Air Vice-Marshal Valston Eldridge Hancock, O.B.E., D.F.C., Royal Australian Air Force.

Civil Division

- Allen Stanley Brown, Esq., Secretary to the Prime Minister's Department and Secretary to the Cabinet.
- Mortimer Eugene McCarthy; Esq., Chairman of the Commonwealth Tariff Board.
- Leslie Galfreid Melville, Esq., Australian Executive Member of the International Bank Board, and Assistant Governor (Central Banking) of the Commonwealth Bank of Australia.
- Alfred Thorpe Stirling, Esq., O.B.E., Her Majesty's Australian Ambassador Extraordinary and Plenipotentiary at The Hague.
- Robert James Vicars, Esq., a Member of the National Security Resources Board. For public services.

==== Officer (OBE) ====
Military Division

- Acting Captain Claude Henry Brooks, Royal Australian Navy.
- Lieutenant-Colonel (temporary Colonel) James William Harrison (3/6.7). Australian Staff Corps.
- Lieutenant-Colonel (temporary Colonel) Robert William Knights(3/76). Australian Staff Corps.
- Lieutenant-Colonel Arthur Leslie MacDonald (1/8), Australian Staff Corps.
- Lieutenant-Colonel Alexander Elder McIntyre, E.D. (3/111001), Royal Australian Armoured Corps.
- Group Captain Maxwell Ormsby Watson, Royal Australian Air Force.

Civil Division

- Mary Valerie, Mrs. Austin. For political and public services.
- Walter Crowther Balmford, Esq., Commonwealth Actuary and Insurance Commissioner.
- Elsie Frances, Mrs. Byth, formerly President of the National Council of Women of Australia.
- George Alfred Cook, Esq., M.C., formerly Secretary to the Commonwealth Scientific and Industrial Research Organisation.
- James Ralph Darling, Esq. For services to Education in Australia.
- Irene Florence, Mrs. Fairbairn, Chief Commissioner for Australia, Girl Guides' Association.
- Henry John Manning, Esq., in recognition of his contribution to the development of the provincial Press in Australia.
- Hugh Raymond McCrae, Esq., an Australian poet and writer.
- Laurence Rupert McIntyre, Esq., Australian Commissioner to Malaya, Singapore.
- Francis Alexander O'Connor, Esq., Deputy Secretary, Department of Supply.
- John Thomas Pinner, Esq., Commissioner. Commonwealth Public Service Board.
- David Stewart, Esq. For services to the Workers' Educational Association in Australia.
- Henry Stanley Temby, Esq., Assistant-Secretary, Prime Minister's Department.
- Edwin Stanley Watt, Esq. For services to ex-servicemen.
- Cecil Montague Williams, Esq. For services to primary industry in Australia.

==== Member (MBE) ====
Military Division

- Lieutenant-at-Arms Norman Craig Webster, Royal Australian Navy.
- Captain Leith John Jones (7/12), Australian Staff Corps.
- Lieutenant (Quartermaster) (Honorary Captain) Hector McMath Samuel Kelley (5/43), Australian Instructional Corps.
- Captain John Strathen Lawry (2/335), Australian Staff Corps.
- Lieutenant (Provisional) Alexander Joseph McArthur (1/54635), Royal Australian Armoured Corps:
- Captain (Honorary Major) Geoffrey Milroy Swan (3/77310), Citizen Military Forces, Australia.
- Captain (temporary Major) Reginald Linnaeus St, John Topp (3/37693), Australian Staff Corps.
- No. 3/540 Warrant Officer Class I Geoffrey James Watson, Royal Australian Armoured Corps.
- Squadron Leader Cyril Albert Victor Bourne (05805), Royal Australian Air Force.
- Squadron Leader Richard Robert Purdie (03342), Royal Australian Air Force.
- Warrant Officer William James Morris (A. 132), Royal Australian Air Force.
- Warrant Officer Edward Joseph Oliver Quinton (A.3770), Royal Australian Air Force.

Civil Division

- William Admans, Esq., one of the original "Hansard" staff, House of Representatives.
- Kate Burgoyne, Mrs. Cowlishaw. For public and patriotic services rendered under the auspices of the Red Cross Society and the Australian Comforts Fund.
- Miss Olive Lelia Douglas, Personal Secretary to the Governor-General.
- Arthur Lindsay Hassett, Esq., an Australian sportsman.
- Edith Phyllis Grace, Mrs. Haynes. For social welfare and political services.
- John Sholl Hodson, Esq., Principal Electrical Engineer, Department of the Navy.
- Ernest William Jewell, Esq. For public and patriotic services.
- George Duncan McKinnon, Esq., a prominent member of the Presbyterian Church in Australia.
- Ethel Margaret, Mrs. Musther. For social welfare services to Naval men and their families.
- Waldemar Ernest Noble, Esq. For public services.
- Vera Fanny, Mrs. Park. For social welfare services to personnel of the Royal Australian Navy.
- James Stewart Parsons, Esq. For public services.
- Commandant Lorna Robinson (Miss Robinson), Australian Red Cross Society.
- Edward Seymour Shaw, Esq. For services to Local Government in Australia.
- Henry Arthur Taylor, Esq. For services rendered in connection with charitable movements in Australia.
- Herbert William Thompson, Esq. For services to the Blind.
- Alfred Richard Townsend, Esq., a former President of the Australian Council of Local Government Associations.
- Miss Evelyn Gardiner (Enid Mary, Mrs. York). For philanthropic and patriotic services in the field of entertainment.

=== British Empire Medal ===
Military Division

- Chief Petty Officer Instructor Arthur Edward Hocking, 2930, Royal Australian Navy.
- No. 1/54542 Sergeant Frank Edward Argaet, Royal Australian Armoured Corps.
- No. 4/9140 Warrant Officer Class H (temporary) Alexander Stewart Black, Royal Australian Engineers.
- No. 3/1227 Staff-Sergeant Frederick Edwin Guenzl, Royal Australian Infantry Corps.
- No. 6/5020 Sergeant Charles Gilbert McKenzie, Royal Australian Artillery.
- No. 2/3835 Corporal (temporary) Robert James Metcalfe, Royal Australian Engineers.
- No. 2/811 Sergeant Cecil Myers, Royal Australian Artillery.
- No. 6/275 Sergeant (temporary) Albert Edgar Pattison, Royal Australian Electrical and Mechanical Engineers.
- A.2710 Flight Sergeant John William Wiggins, Royal Australian Air Force.
- A. 1321 Sergeant John Hewson Needham, Royal Australian Air Force.
- A.31966 Sergeant Hector Kyle Pyers, Royal Australian Air Force.
- A.21171 Corporal William Robert Sanders, Royal Australian Air Force.

=== Royal Red Cross ===
Associate

- Principal Matron Charlotte Joan McRae, Royal Australian Air Force Nursing Service.

=== Air Force Cross ===
- Flight Lieutenant Frederick William Barnes, D.F.C. (033196), Royal Australian Air Force.
- Flight Lieutenant Frederick James Lawrenson, D.F.C. (022005), Royal Australian Air Force.
- Flight Lieutenant Maxwell James McKay (022042), Royal Australian Air Force.
- Flight Lieutenant James Stewart Wilson (022003), Royal Australian Air Force.

=== Queen's Commendation for Valuable Service in the Air ===
- Flight Lieutenant Thomas Jewitt Tudbery Meldrum (012631), Royal Australian Air Force.
- Flight Lieutenant Christopher John Sugden (05813), Royal Australian Air Force.

== Ceylon ==
Honours conferred on the advice of Her Majesty's Ceylon Ministers.

=== Knights Bachelor ===
- Herbert Eric Jansz, Esq., CMG., Chairman, Public Service Commission

=== Order of St Michael and St George ===
==== Companion (CMG) ====
- Ralph Norman Bond, Esq., O.B.E., Permanent Secretary, Ministry of Posts and Information.

=== Knight Commander (KBE) ===
Civil Division

- His Excellency Edwin Aloysius Perera Wijeyeratne, High Commissioner for Ceylon in the United Kingdom.

==== Commander (CBE) ====
Civil Division

- Warusahennedige Leo Fernando, Esq., O.B.E.. Member of Parliament for Buttala.
- Warusahennedige Abraham Bastian Soysa, Esq., M.B.E., Senator.

==== Officer (OBE) ====
Civil Division

- Simon Reginald Gunewardene, Esq., M.R.C.S., L.R.C.P., Medical Superintendent, State Home for the Aged, Koggala.
- Markandu Kanagasabay, Esq., General Manager, Ceylon Government Railway.
- Edwin Mendis Karunaratne, Esq., Proctor. For social services in Galle district.
- Sangarapully Sellamuttu, Esq., Member, Colombo Municipal Council.
- Sabapathipillai Albert Selvanayagam, Esq., M.B.E., Member, Batticaloa Urban Council.
- Charles Francis Whitaker, Esq., lately Secretary, Chamber of Commerce.
- Chandradasa Wijesinghe, Esq., Planter. For social services in the Southern Province.
- Basil Henry William, Esq., Managing Director, High Level Road Bus Company Limited.

==== Member (MBE) ====
Military Division

- Lieutenant-Commander (S) Kenneth Maitand Martinus; Royal Ceylon Navy.
- Major Roy Douglas Jayetileke, Ceylon Army.

Civil Division

- Ella Marjorie, Mrs. Atkinson. For services to the encouragement of dancing.
- A. Arulpiragasam, Esq., Registrar-General.
- Lucien Noel Bartholomeusz, Esq., F.R.C.S., Visiting Surgeon, General Hospital, Colombo.
- Al'Haj Mohamed Purvis Drahaman, Esq., Medical Practitioner. For services to the Malay Community.
- Peter Frederick Alwis 'Goonetileka, Esq., Proctor. For services to the Co-operative Movement.
- Sago Sudhira Jayawickrama, Esq. For services to cricket.
- Don Wilfred Richard Kahawita, Esq., Designs Engineer in Charge, Designs and Research Sections, Irrigation Department.
- Wimala Irene, Mrs. Kannangara, District Representative, Kegalla District, Lanka Malhila Samiti Movement.
- George Keyt, Esq., Artist.
- Vitarana Simon Nanayakkara, Esq., Assistant Municipal Treasurer, Colombo, Municipal Council.
- Edward Ashley Peries, Esq., Crown Proctor, Kegalla.
- Wasala Bandaranayake Herat Mudiyanse Ralahamillage Tikiri Banda Poholiyadde, Esq., Member of Parliament for Horowupotana.
- A. B. Rajendra, Esq., Senator.
- M. Srikantha, Esq., Director, Land Development Department.

== Pakistan ==
Honours conferred on the advice of Her Majesty's Pakistan Ministers.

=== Knight Bachelor ===
- Thomas Hobart Ellis, Esq., Chief Justice, East Bengal High Court.

=== Order of the Bath ===
==== Companion (CB) ====
- Rear-Admiral James Wilfred Jefford, C.B.E., Royal Pakistan Navy.

=== Order of St Michael and St George ===
==== Companion (CMG) ====
- Lieutenant-Colonel John Raymond Hainsworth, C.B.E., lately Chief Engineer and Secretary to Government, North-West Frontier Province.

=== Order of the British Empire ===
==== Commander (CBE) ====
Military Division

- Brigadier William Proctor Bell Ashton, O.B.E., M.C. (31326), Corps of Royal Electrical and Mechanical Engineers.
- Lieutenant-Colonel (local Brigadier) Thomas Ivan Bowers, D.S.O., M.C., Special List (ex Indian Army).
- Brigadier (temporary) Cuthbert Harold Boyd Rodham, D.S.O., O.B.E. (IA.858), Infantry.

Civil Division

- William John Mason, Esq., Director of Ordnance Factories.
- Harry Sparrow, Esq., Chief Mechanical Engineer, North Western Railway.

==== Officer (OBE) ====
Military Division

- Acting Captain Colin Gaydor Little, D.S.C., Royal Australian Navy.
- Wing Commander Frederick William Jenkins (35045), Royal Air Force.

Civil Division

- Henry Francis Dennison, Esq., M.B.E., Signal Engineer, East Bengal Railway.
- Eric Launcelot Everatt, Esq., Chief Engineer, Karachi Port Trust.
- James Douglas Hardy, Esq., Officer on special duty, Ministry of Communications.
- Raymond George Mellor, Esq., M.B.E., Senior Superintendent of Police, Baluchistan.

==== Member (MBE) ====
Military Division

- Major (temporary) William Gordon (EC 10958), Army Physical Training Corps.
- Major (temporary) Joseph Newbury (CC.294), Special List.

Civil Division

- Brian St. Clair Allum, Esq., Commandant, Punjab Constabulary.
- Charles Chaplain Bowles, Esq., Assistant Director (Engineering), Directorate of Ordnance Factories.
- Walter Stephen Houghton, Esq., Works Manager (Mechanical Engineering), Directorate of Ordnance Factories.
