= Il-22 =

Il-22 may refer to:

- Ilyushin Il-22, a Russian jet bomber aircraft prototype flown in 1947
- Ilyushin Il-22, the airborne command post version of the Russian turboprop airliner Ilyushin Il-18

== See also ==
- IL-22 (disambiguation)
