= John Crampton =

British pilot

Squadron Leader John Crampton DFC AFC (21 August 1921 – 12 June 2010) was a British pilot who conducted spy flights into the Soviet Union in the early 1950s.

== Early life ==
John Crampton was born in Weybridge, Surrey in 1921 and was educated at Harrow. He joined the Royal Air Force in 1940 and trained as a pilot in Canada. He qualified as a flying instructor and instructed at the Royal Air Force flying school in Moose Jaw. On his return to England he joined 76 Squadron in RAF Bomber Command flying Handley Page Halifax bombers. The Halifax squadrons flew their last bombing operation on 25 April 1945 when they pounded the heavy gun emplacements on Wangerooge Island, which guarded the entrance to the key port of Bremen. When the war ended, Crampton was awarded the Distinguished Flying Cross.

== Spy pilot ==
In the early postwar years, Crampton transitioned from piston-engined bombers to jet fighters, piloting the Gloster Meteor as part of 12 Group at RAF Horsham St. Faith and later the de Havilland Vampire. In July 1951 he was selected to lead a special duty flight that would train on USAF RB-45C reconnaissance aircraft. After extensive training at Barksdale Air Force Base, his crew which included his navigator Rex Sanders and two others began covert operations. Code-named Operation Ju-jitsu, four North American RB-45C Tornado aircraft were stripped of their USAF markings and repainted in RAF colours. Based at RAF Sculthorpe, the aircraft were tasked with flying deep level reconnaissance missions over the Soviet Union to gather electronic and photographic intelligence. The special duties flight conducted missions during the period 1952–54. It was not until 1994 (under the "fifty year rule" of the Public Records Act 1958) that the existence of the spy missions became public knowledge. During the final mission, Crampton's aircraft came under anti-aircraft fire and was nearly intercepted by MiG 15s. In the aftermath, the Jiu Jitsu flights were folded up. Initially, Squadron Leader Micky Martin of Dambusters fame was chosen to lead the operations but he failed a mandatory high altitude pressurisation test and Crampton was selected instead. He was awarded the Air Force Cross on 10 June 1954.

== Later career ==
After the Jiu Jitsu missions came to a temporary close, Crampton was posted to 101 Squadron flying English Electric Canberras at RAF Binbrook in 1952. He took part in several formation air displays around Europe to show off the Canberra's abilities. He retired from the RAF in 1957 and joined Hawker Aircraft where he became Technical Sales Manager. His main assignment was to promote the Harrier jump jet. He retired from the aviation industry in 1983.

Crampton became vice president of the British Model Flying Association in 1974.

A motor racing enthusiast, Crampton owned a Maserati 8C which he used to compete at the Shelsley Walsh Hillclimb in 1948.
