= Convair XB-53 =

American bomber/attack aircraft project

XB-53
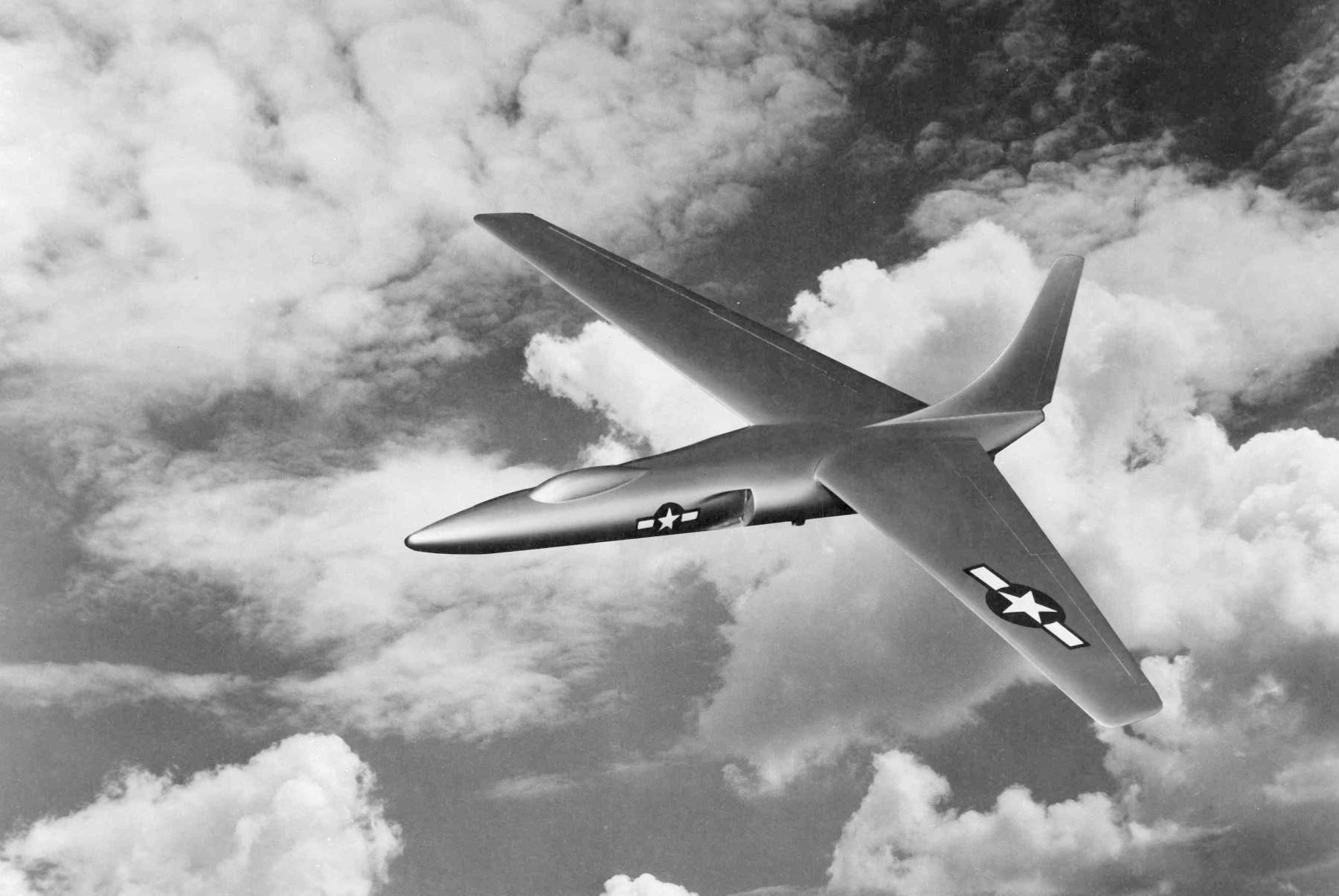
- 1946 design then designated XA-44

General information
- Type: Attack aircraft
- Manufacturer: Convair
- Status: Cancelled in 1949
- Primary user: United States Air Force
- Number built: 0

The Convair XB-53 was a proposed jet-powered medium bomber aircraft, designed by Convair for the United States Army Air Forces. With a radical tailless, forward-swept wing design, the aircraft appeared futuristic; however, the project was canceled before either of the two prototypes were completed.

== Design and development ==
The project was originally designated XA-44 in 1945 under the old "attack" category. An unusual forward-swept wing-design powered by three J35-GE turbojets, the project was developed in parallel with Convair's XB-46. The original design had a wing with a 12° forward-sweep and a solid nose section, but when the Army Air Force revamped the advanced attack aircraft requirement into a light bomber requirement in 1946, the aircraft was redesignated XB-53 and the wing redesigned with a 30° forward-sweep and 8° dihedral that was borrowed from German wartime research, but also a glazed nose section. The swept-forward configuration would give the aircraft a greater climb rate and maneuverability. It looked promising enough at one point for the Army Air Force to consider canceling the XB-46 in favor of the XA-44, since there was not enough funding for both.

Classified as a medium bomber, the XB-53 would have carried up to 12,000 pounds of bombs as well as 40 High Velocity Aerial Rockets (HVAR) mounted on underwing pylons.

Convair argued for completion of the XB-46 prototype as a flying testbed, without armament and other equipment, and with the substitution of two XA-44s for the other two B-46 airframes on contract. The Air Force ratified this in June 1946 but the project did not progress, nor were additional B-46s built. The XB-53 program was reinstated in February 1949 but only for a short while.

== Specifications (XB-53 estimated) ==
Data from

General characteristics

- Crew: four
- Length: 79 ft 5 in (24.2 m)
- Wingspan: 80 ft 9 in (24.6 m)
- Height: 23 ft 8 in (7.22 m)
- Wing area: 1,370 sq ft (127 m^{2})
- Empty weight: 31,760 lb (14,406 kg)
- Max takeoff weight: 60,000 lb (27,216 kg)
- Powerplant: 3 × Allison J35 turbojets, 4,000 lbf (18 kN) thrust each

Performance

- Maximum speed: 500 kn (580 mph, 930 km/h)
- Range: 1,700 nmi (2,000 mi, 3,200 km)
- Service ceiling: 44,000 ft (13,000 m)

Armament

- Bombs: 12,000 lb (5,443 kg)

== See also ==
Related lists

- List of attack aircraft
- List of bomber aircraft
- List of military aircraft of the United States
