= Tornado bomber =

Tornado bomber may refer to

- North American B-45 Tornado, a first generation jet bomber aircraft
- Panavia Tornado, a 1970s multi-role aircraft which in the IDS variant is used as an interdictor
