= Convair XB-46 =

American bomber prototype

XB-46
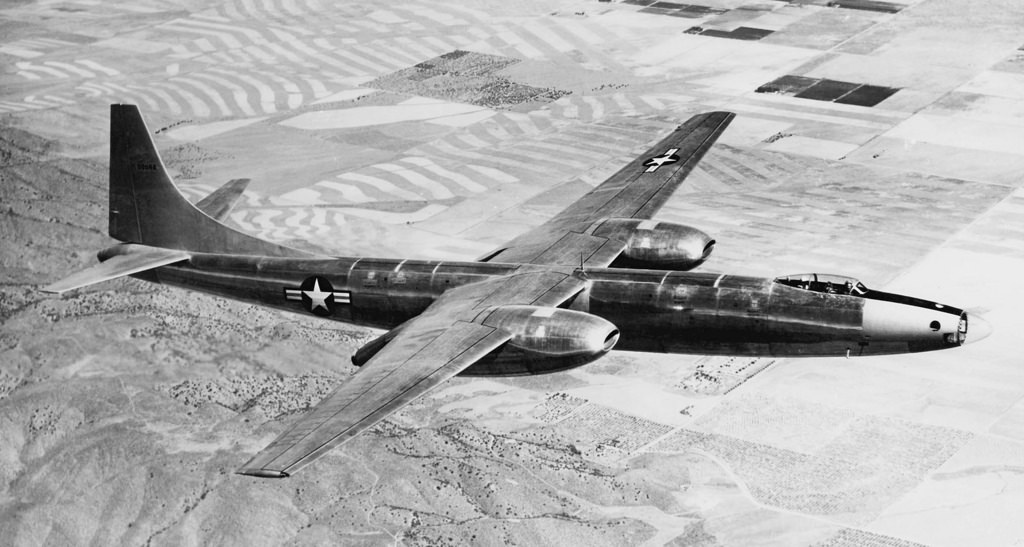

General information
- Type: Medium bomber
- Manufacturer: Convair
- Status: Cancelled
- Primary user: United States Air Force
- Number built: 1

History
- First flight: 2 April 1947
- Retired: 1947

The Convair XB-46 was a single example of an experimental medium jet bomber which was developed in the mid-1940s but which never saw production or active duty. It competed with similar designs, the North American XB-45 and Martin XB-48, all of which saw little use after the successful development of the Boeing XB-47.

== Development ==
In 1944, the War Department was aware of aviation advances in Germany and issued a requirement for a range of designs for medium bombers weighing from 80,000 pounds (36,000 kg) to more than 200,000 pounds (91,000 kg). Other designs resulting from this competition, sometimes named the class of '45, included the North American XB-45 and the Martin XB-48. Procurement began with a letter contract (cost-plus-fixed-fee) on 17 January 1945 with mockup inspection and approval in early February. Orders for three prototypes followed on 27 February 1945 with certain changes recommended by the board. Serials 45-59582 to 59584 were assigned. Budgetary concerns also led to the contract being changed to a fixed-price type.

In the fall of 1945, Convair found it was competing with itself when the USAAF became interested in an unorthodox forward-swept wing jet attack design, the XA-44-CO that the company had also been working on. With the end of World War II severely curtailing budgets, the company considered canceling the XB-46 in favor of the other project as there was insufficient funding for both. Company officials argued that it made more sense to allow them to complete the XB-46 prototype as a stripped-down testbed omitting armament and other equipment and for the AAF to allow them to proceed with two XA-44 airframes in lieu of the other two XB-46s on contract. In June 1946, the AAF agreed to the substitution but that project was ultimately cancelled in December 1946 before the prototypes were completed. The B-46 would be completed with only the equipment necessary to prove its airworthiness and handling characteristics.

The XB-46 had a long streamlined oval torpedo-shaped fuselage, long narrow straight shoulder-mounted wings with four Chevrolet-built J35-C3 axial-flow eleven stage turbojets of 3,820 pounds-force (17.0 kN) static thrust paired in an integral nacelle under each wing. The fuselage turned out to be a problem, as it distorted under flight loads. The pilots sat in tandem in a pressurized fighter-style cockpit under a single Plexiglas teardrop canopy with the bombardier-navigator-radio operator in a transparent Plexiglas nose section.

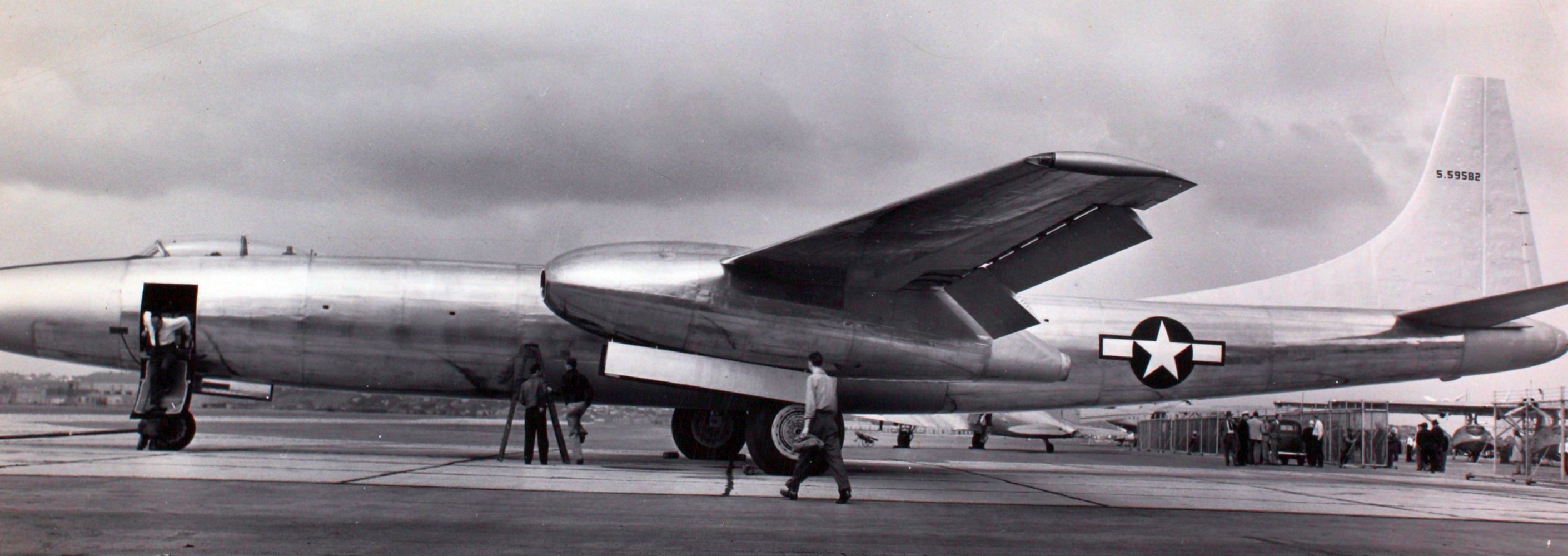
XB-46 aileron and spoiler detail

The straight wing had an aspect ratio of 11.6, and was equipped with Fowler flaps which extended over 90 percent of the span, in four sections. The flaps extended via electrical actuators, and had very small ailerons. Each wing had five spoilers made of perforated magnesium alloy. The engine air intakes were flat oval inlets, with a duct curving downward in a flat “S” to the engines, which were mounted behind the leading edge of the wing. The unusual flight control system utilized a system of pneumatic piping to transmit the pilot's control inputs and actuate various systems, rather than the more typical hydraulic, manual or electrical control lines and systems of most aircraft of the era.

Production versions were to be equipped with a pair of .50 caliber Browning M2 machine guns in a tail turret designed by Emerson Electric Company and provision was made for an APG-27 remote control optics and sighting system, but no weaponry was fitted into the prototype. Likewise, production aircraft were intended to be built with the General Electric J47 engines with 5,200 lbf (23 kN) static thrust rather than the J35s used on the prototype.

== Testing ==
The XB-46's first flight occurred 2 April 1947 after a month of taxi testing, and lasted ninety minutes as the bomber departed the Convair plant in San Diego, California for Muroc Army Airfield in the high desert. The pilot praised its handling qualities. Basic flight testing took place for five months, and by September 1947 it was concluded after 127 hours aloft on 64 flights by both the Convair company and AAF test pilots. Stability and control were excellent but there were engineering problems with engine de-icing, the cabin air system, and vertical oscillations caused by harmonic resonance between the wing and spoilers. There was also concern regarding the ability of the three man crew to exit the aircraft in case of an emergency, since the exit plan relied on the pneumatic system to hold the main door open against the airstream. The aircraft was accepted on 7 November and delivered on 12 November 1947.

== Cancellation ==
The B-46 program was cancelled in August 1947, even before flight testing had been completed, because it was already obsolete. The North American B-45 Tornado already had production orders, and even it would be eclipsed by the Boeing B-47 Stratojet's superior performance. Furthermore, the bulky radar fire-control system which was not installed in the XB-46 prototype would have undoubtedly forced an expensive redesign of the slender fuselage. Subsequent testing investigated excessive noise, tail vibration, and stability and control issues, and was conducted at Palm Beach Air Force Base, Florida between August 1948 and August 1949. After 44 additional flight hours, the XB-46 was taken out of service, since the cost of support and maintenance, coupled with a lack of spare parts, had become prohibitive. After sitting idle for a year, it was flown to Eglin Air Force Base, Florida, in July 1950, where its pneumatic system was tested under the coldest conditions in the large climatic facility there. Most jet aircraft of this period used hydraulic or electrical systems, so the pneumatic control system of this aircraft offered a unique opportunity for investigation. When this testing program was concluded in November 1950, the Air Force no longer had need for the XB-46, a fact acknowledged in the press as early as August, and on 13 January 1951 the nose section was sent to the U.S. Air Force Museum at Wright-Patterson Air Force Base, Ohio, although it appears that the airframe section has not survived in the collection. The rest of the airframe was scrapped on 28 February 1952.

== Specifications (XB-46) ==
Data from General Dynamic Aircraft and their Predecessors

General characteristics

- Crew: 3
- Length: 105 ft 9 in (32.23 m)
- Wingspan: 113 ft 0 in (34.44 m)
- Height: 27 ft 11 in (8.51 m)
- Wing area: 1,285 sq ft (119.4 m^{2})
- Aspect ratio: 11.6
- Empty weight: 48,018 lb (21,781 kg)
- Gross weight: 91,000 lb (41,277 kg)
- Max takeoff weight: 95,600 lb (43,363 kg)
- Powerplant: 4 × Allison J35-A-3 turbojet engines, 4,000 lbf (18 kN) thrust each

Performance

- Maximum speed: 545 mph (877 km/h, 474 kn)
- Cruise speed: 439 mph (707 km/h, 381 kn)
- Range: 2,870 mi (4,620 km, 2,490 nmi)
- Service ceiling: 40,000 ft (12,000 m)
- Time to altitude: 35,000 ft (11,000 m) 19 minutes

Armament

- Guns: 2 × .50 in (12.7 mm) M2 Browning machine guns
- Bombs: 22,000 lb (10,000 kg)

== See also ==
Aircraft of comparable role, configuration, and era

- Boeing B-47 Stratojet
- English Electric Canberra
- Ilyushin Il-22
- Martin XB-48
- North American B-45 Tornado

Related lists

- List of bomber aircraft
- List of military aircraft of the United States

== Bibliography ==
- Andrade, John M. (1979). U.S. Military Aircraft Designations and Serials since 1909. Midland Counties Publications. ISBN 0-904597-22-9.
- Ginter, Steve (2016). Consolidated Vultee XB-46. Air Force Legends. Vol. 221. Steve Ginter Books. ISBN 978-0-9968258-4-9.
- Gunston, Bill (1979). Jet Bombers from the Messerschmitt Me 262 to the Stealth B-2. Osprey Aerospace. ISBN 1-85532-258-7.
- Knaack, Marcelle Size (1988). Post-World War II Bombers, 1945-1973. Office of Air Force History. ISBN 0-16-002260-6.
- Wegg, John (1990). General Dynamics Aircraft and their Predecessors. Putnam. ISBN 0-85177-833-X.
