= Hughes XH-17 =

American helicopter prototype (1952–55)

XH-17 "Flying Crane"
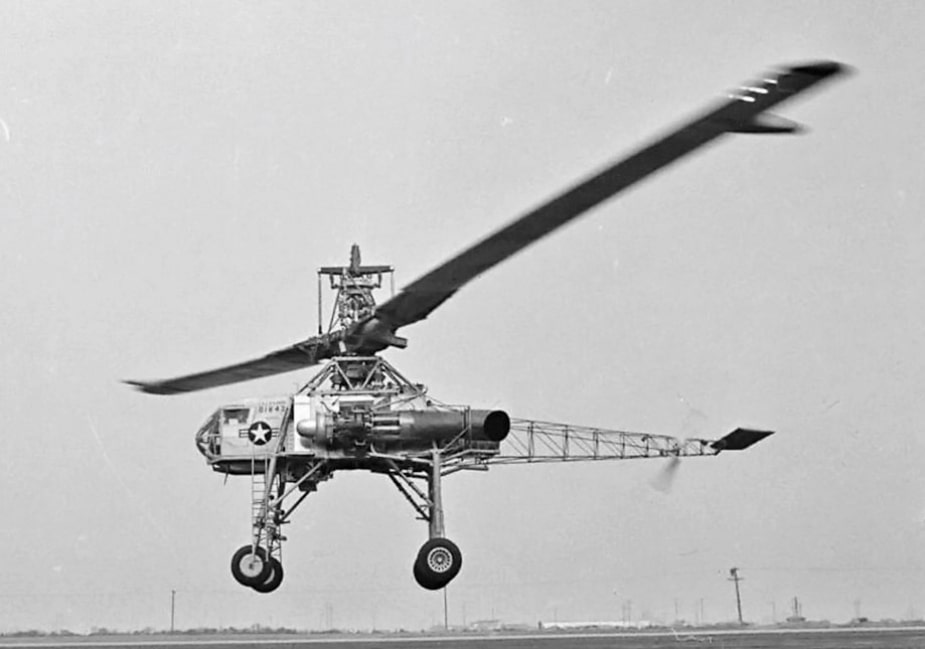

General information
- Type: Helicopter
- Manufacturer: Hughes Helicopters
- Status: Scrapped
- Number built: 1

History
- First flight: 23 October 1952
- Retired: December 1955

The Hughes XH-17 "Flying Crane" was the first helicopter project for the helicopter division of Hughes Aircraft Company. The XH-17, which had a two-bladed main rotor system with a diameter of 134 feet (41 m), still holds the world record for flying with the largest rotor system. It was capable of flying at a gross weight of more than 50,000 pounds (23,000 kg), but proved too inefficient and cumbersome to be mass-produced beyond the prototype unit.

== Design and development ==
The XH-17 was a heavy-lift rotorcraft that was designed to lift loads in excess of 15 metric tons. To speed construction, parts of the XH-17 were scavenged from other aircraft. The front wheels came from a North American B-25 Mitchell and the rear wheels from a Douglas C-54 Skymaster. The fuel tank was a bomb bay-mounted unit from a Boeing B-29 Superfortress. The cockpit was from a Waco CG-15 military glider and the tail rotor from a Sikorsky H-19 Chickasaw was used for yaw control.

In the late 1940s, Hughes developed an interest in helicopters. In August 1947, helicopter manufacturer Kellett sold his design for the giant XH-17 Sky Crane to Hughes, who commissioned the development of the XH-17 Flying Crane research vehicle. In 1948, the XH-17 began to take shape. The giant helicopter was tested in Culver City, California over a three-year period beginning in 1952. The XH-17 flew in 1953 at a gross weight in excess of 50,000 pounds (23,000 kg). It still holds the record for flying with the world's largest rotor system. Only one unit was built, since the aircraft was too cumbersome and inefficient to warrant further development.

The propulsion system was unusual. Two General Electric J35 turbojet engines were used, sending bleed air up through the rotor hub. The blades were hollow, and the hot compressed air traveled through the blades to tip jets where fuel was injected. In flight, the main rotor spun at a sedate 88 revolutions per minute, less than half the speed of typical helicopter rotors. Since the rotor was driven at the tips rather than the hub, little torque compensation was required, mostly due to friction in the main rotor bearing. Thus, the XH-17 had a very small tail rotor compared to its main rotor. This drive system was inefficient, limiting the test aircraft to a range of only 40 miles (64 km).

The XH-28 was a derivative, with a maximum weight of 104,000 pounds (47,000 kg). Though a wooden mockup of the design was made, the program was canceled and none were built.

== Specifications ==
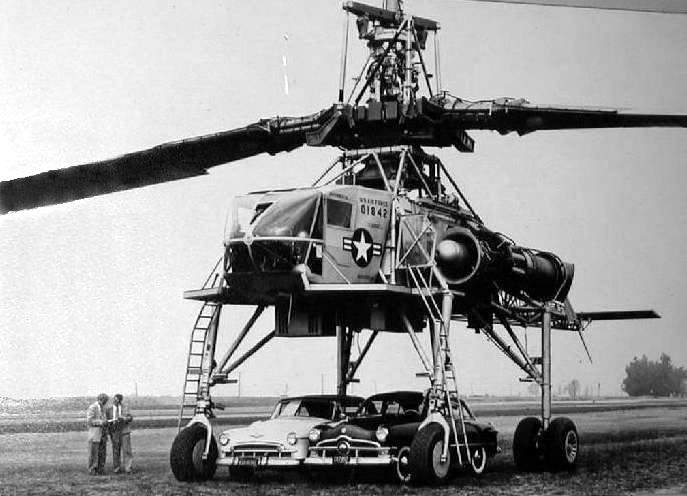
Two cars parked beneath the XH-17 give a sense of scale.

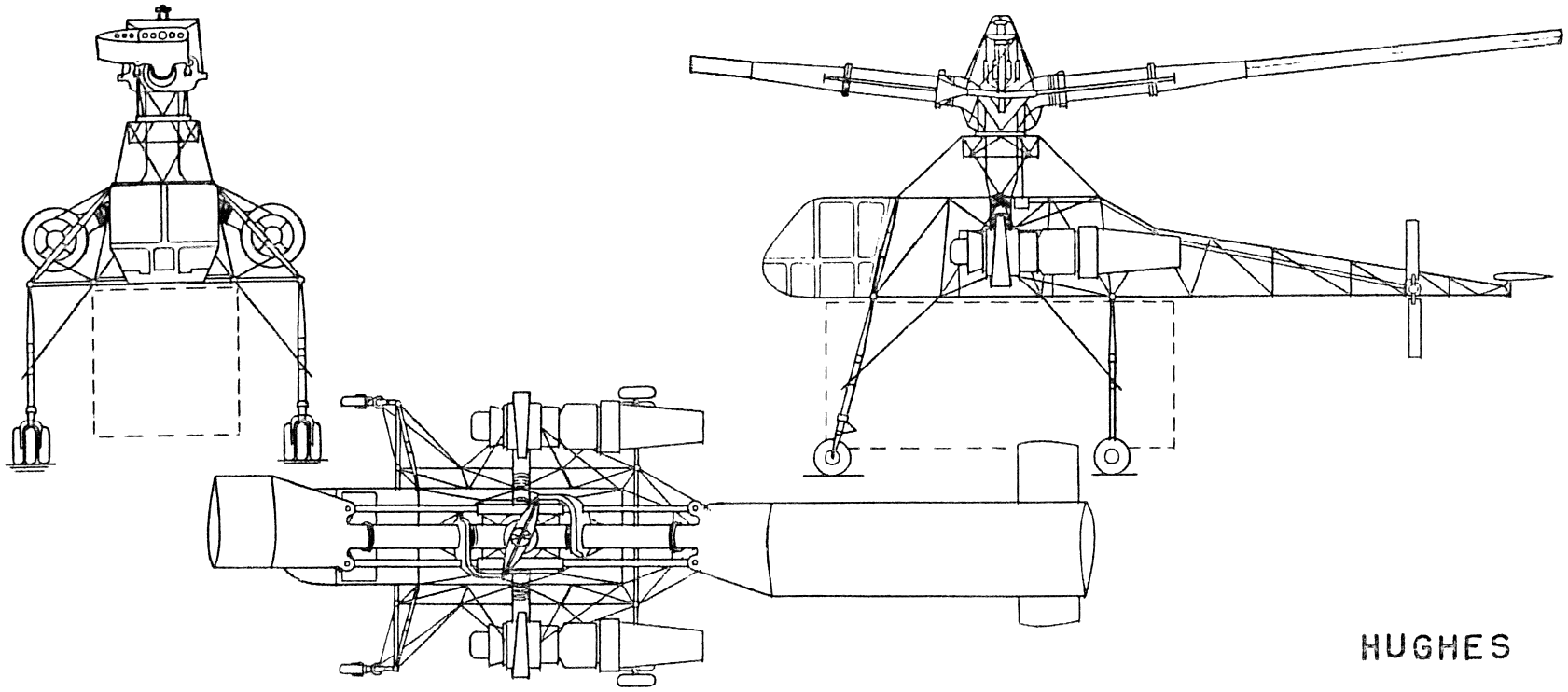
3-view line drawing of the Hughes XH-17

Data from McDonnell Douglas aircraft since 1920 Vol.2

General characteristics

- Crew: 3 (pilot, mechanic and in-flight test engineer)
- Capacity: demonstrated loads up to 10,284 lb (4,665 kg) were carried
- Length: 53 ft 3.6 in (16.246 m)
- Height: 30 ft 1.2 in (9.174 m)
- Empty weight: 28,562 lb (12,956 kg)
- Gross weight: 31,270 lb (14,184 kg)
- Max takeoff weight: 43,500 lb (19,731 kg)
- Fuel capacity: 635 US gal (529 imp gal; 2,404 L) (Boeing B-29 bomb-bay tank)
- Powerplant: 2 × General Electric 7E-TG-180-XR-17A gas generators, 3,480 hp (2,600 kW) each combined predicted gas power output, with rotor turning at 88 rpm
- Main rotor diameter: 130 ft (40 m)
- Main rotor area: 13,274.95 sq ft (1,233.283 m^{2})

Performance

- Maximum speed: 90 mph (140 km/h, 78 kn) at 8,000 ft (2,438 m)
- Cruise speed: 85 mph (137 km/h, 74 kn)
- Range: 30 mi (48 km, 26 nmi) with 10,284 lb (4,665 kg) payload
- Service ceiling: 13,100 ft (4,000 m)
- Rate of climb: 1,650 ft/min (8.4 m/s)
- Disk loading: 2.4 lb/sq ft (12 kg/m^{2})
- Power/mass: 0.111 hp/lb (0.182 kW/kg)

== See also ==
Aircraft of comparable role, configuration, and era

- Sikorsky S-60
- Sikorsky CH-54 Tarhe
- Sikorsky S-64 Skycrane
- Mil Mi-10
