= North American FJ-1 Fury =

First US Navy jet aircraft

FJ-1 Fury
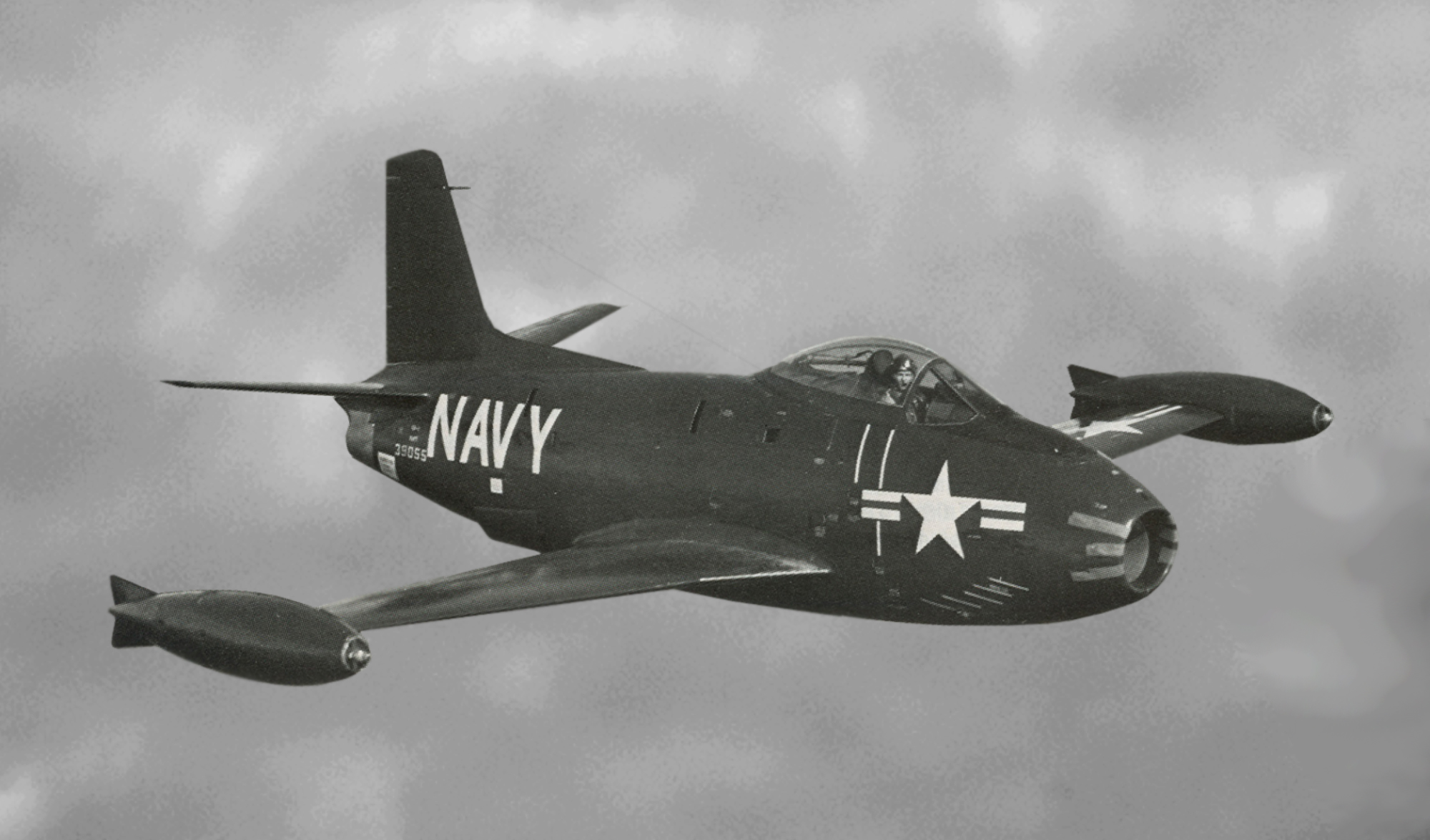
- US Navy FJ-1 Fury

General information
- Type: Fighter aircraft
- National origin: United States
- Manufacturer: North American Aviation
- Status: Retired
- Primary user: United States Navy
- Number built: 33 (including 3 prototypes)

History
- Introduction date: March 1948
- First flight: 27 November 1946
- Retired: 1953
- Developed into: North American F-86 Sabre

The North American FJ-1 Fury is an early turbojet-powered carrier-capable fighter aircraft used by the United States Navy (USN). Developed by North American Aviation (NAA) starting in 1945, it became the first jet aircraft in USN service to serve at sea under operational conditions. This first version of the FJ was a straight-winged jet, briefly operational during the transition to more successful designs. An evolution of the FJ-1 would become the land-based XP-86 prototype of the United States Air Force's enormously influential F-86 Sabre, which in turn formed the basis for the Navy's carrier-based, swept-winged North American FJ-2/-3 Fury.

== Design and development ==
In late 1944, the USN sought proposals for a follow-on aircraft to supplement its first jet fighter, the McDonnell XFD-1 Phantom; three competing proposals from NAA, McDonnell Aircraft Corporation and Vought were selected. The NAA NA-134 was ordered on 1 January 1945 as the XFJ-1 and would be developed in parallel with the Vought F6U Pirate (the competing McDonnell proposal would eventually evolve into the McDonnell F2H Banshee.)

In terms of its general configuration, the XFJ-1 was a straight-wing, tricycle gear fighter with a single General Electric J35 turbojet that was fed by an intake which passed through the fuselage. To avoid bifurcating the intake and thus increasing drag, the cockpit was placed entirely above the intake duct, which gave the aircraft a somewhat squat appearance. The XFJ-1 was armed with six .50 BMG machine guns mounted next to the air intake, making it the last aircraft ordered by the USN to use .50 BMG guns as its primary armament. The wing, empennage, and canopy strongly resembled that of the piston-engined P-51D Mustang, North American Aviation's highly successful World War II fighter, enclosing a relocated cockpit accommodation further forward in relation to the Mustang's design, to ensure good forward pilot visibility for carrier operations.

== Operational history ==
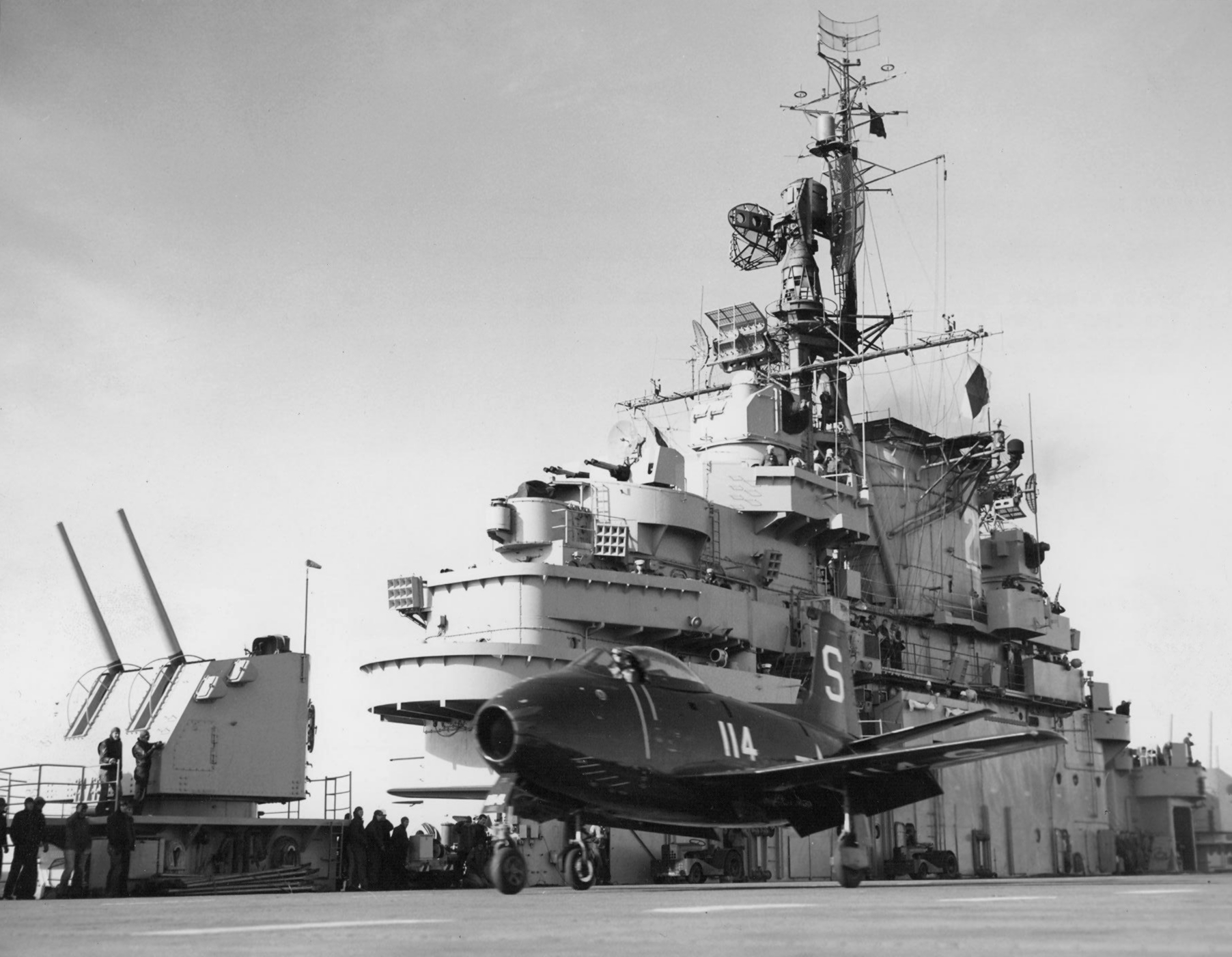
An FJ-1 of VF-51 aboard USS Boxer in March 1948

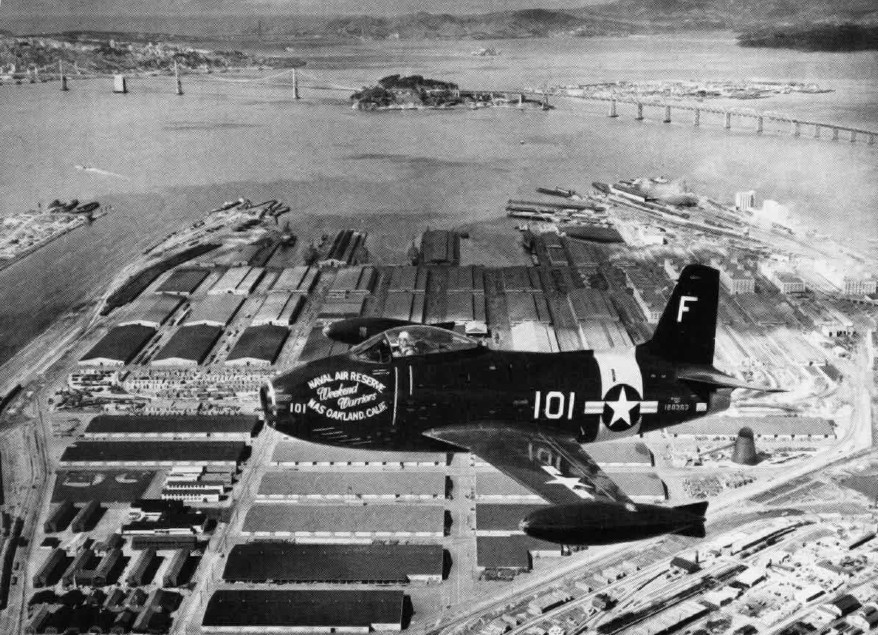
An Oakland Naval Air Reserve FJ-1 over Oakland, California, in 1950

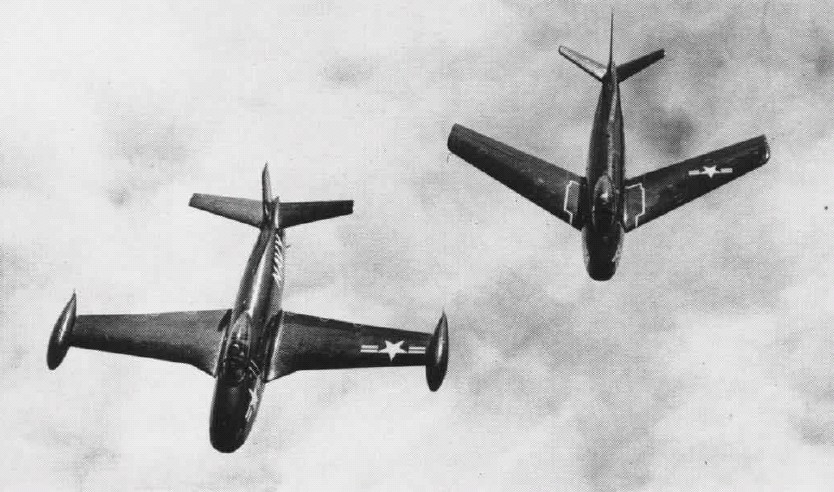
FJ-1 and FJ-2 in 1952

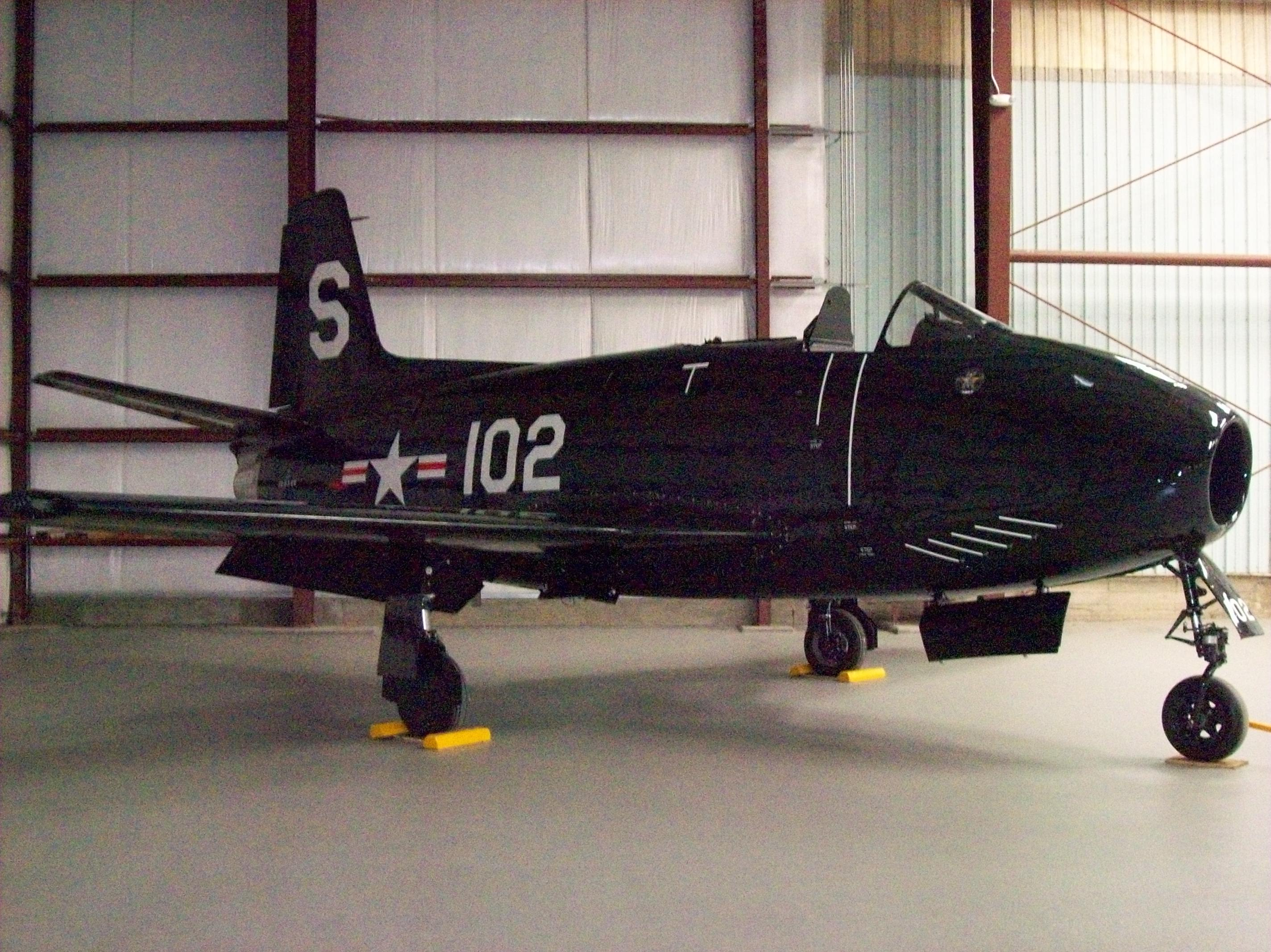
FJ-1 Fury at Yanks Air Museum

The first flight of the prototype XFJ-1 was conducted on 27 November 1946, and the first of 30 deliveries of the improved NA-141, designated FJ-1, took place in March 1948. Flown by Navy squadron VF-5A, the FJ-1 made the USN's first operational aircraft carrier landing with a jet fighter at sea (Note: The first all-jet aircraft to take off and land from an American carrier was a McDonnell XFD-1 Phantom on 21 July 1946 from USS Franklin D. Roosevelt, but the tests were not conducted under operational conditions.) on 10 March 1948 aboard USS Boxer, pioneering US jet-powered carrier operations and underscoring the need for catapult-equipped carriers. The Fury was capable of launching without catapult assistance, but on a crowded flight deck the capability was of limited use. Taking off without a catapult launch limited the FJ-1 to a perilous, slow climb that was considered too risky for normal operations.

As German research into swept wing aerodynamics was not yet available when the design was finalized, the FJ-1 used a straight wing. Folding wings were not used because dive brakes mounted in the wings made them unfeasible. To conserve carrier deck space, a "kneeling" nose gear strut along with a swiveling "jockey wheel" allowed the FJ-1 to be stacked tail-high, close to another FJ-1.

Before the first production FJ-1 was even delivered, the initial order for 100 units was trimmed to only 30 because more promising naval fighter designs had entered development. The production aircraft were initially used in testing at NAS North Island, California. VF-5A, soon redesignated as VF-51, operated the type from Boxer in March 1948 and from USS Princeton in August 1948, but operations did not go well, and the aircraft proved to have weak landing gear. One of the four FJ-1s to operate from Princeton was destroyed in a hard landing on arrival and went over the side; fortunately the pilot was rescued, but further accidents resulted in the cancellation of the operations after only two days. Although VF-51 went to sea on Boxer one more time in May 1949, the FJ-1s were phased out afterwards in favor of the new F9F-2 Panther.

Ending its service career in United States Naval Reserve units, the FJ-1 was eventually retired in 1953. The one highlight in its short service life was VF-51's win in the Bendix Trophy Race for jets in September 1948. The unit entered seven FJ-1s, flying from Long Beach, California to Cleveland, Ohio, with VF-51 aircraft taking the first four places, ahead of two California Air National Guard Lockheed F-80 Shooting Stars.

== Variants ==
XFJ-1
Prototype aircraft, powered by a 3,820 lbf (17 kN) General Electric J35-GE-2 turbojet engine, three built.
FJ-1 Fury
Single-seat fighter aircraft, powered by a 4,000 lbf (17.8 kN) Allison J35-A-2 turbojet engine, armed with six 0.50 in (12.7 mm) machine guns, 30 aircraft built and further 70 were cancelled.

== Operators ==
United States

- United States Navy
  - United States Naval Reserves
  - United States Marine Corps

== Aircraft on display ==
FJ-1

- 120349 - Yanks Air Museum in Chino, California.
- 120351 - National Air and Space Museum in Washington, D.C.

== Specifications (FJ-1) ==
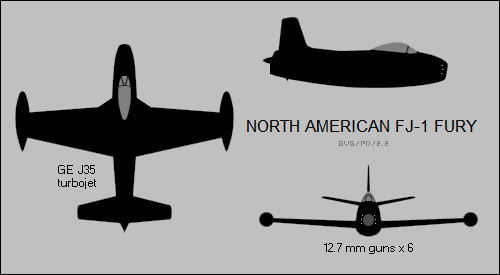
Line drawings for the FJ-1 Fury

Data from United States Navy Aircraft since 1911

General characteristics

- Crew: 1
- Length: 34 ft 5 in (10.49 m)
- Wingspan: 38 ft 2 in (11.63 m)
- Height: 14 ft 10 in (4.52 m)
- Wing area: 221 sq ft (20.5 m^{2})
- Empty weight: 8,843 lb (4,011 kg)
- Gross weight: 15,600 lb (7,076 kg)
- Fuel provisions Internal fuel load: 465 gal (1,743 L), Wing Tip Tanks: 2 × 170 gal (644 L)
- Powerplant: 1 × Allison J35-A-2 turbojet, 4,000 lbf (18 kN) thrust

Performance

- Maximum speed: 475 kn (547 mph, 880 km/h) at 9,000 ft (2,700 m)
- Stall speed: 105.5 kn (121 mph, 195 km/h)(ferry range)
- Combat range: 530 nmi (610 mi, 980 km) (combat radius)
- Ferry range: 1,300 nmi (1,500 mi, 2,400 km)
- Service ceiling: 32,000 ft (9,800 m)
- Rate of climb: 3,300 ft/min (17 m/s) at sea level

Armament

- Guns: 6 × 0.50 in (12.7 mm) M2 Browning machine guns (1,500 rounds in total)

== See also ==
Family tree of Sabre & Fury variants

Related development

- North American P-51 Mustang
- North American F-86 Sabre
- North American FJ-2/-3 Fury
- North American FJ-4 Fury

Aircraft of comparable role, configuration, and era

- de Havilland Sea Vampire
- Gloster E.1/44
- Grumman F9F Panther
- Hawker Sea Hawk
- McDonnell FH Phantom
- Republic F-84 Thunderjet
- Supermarine Attacker
- Vought F6U Pirate
- Saab 29 Tunnan
- Yakovlev Yak-19

Related lists

- List of fighter aircraft
- List of military aircraft of the United States
- List of Sabre and Fury units in US military
