= Rex Sanders =

British Royal Air Force officer (1922–2017)

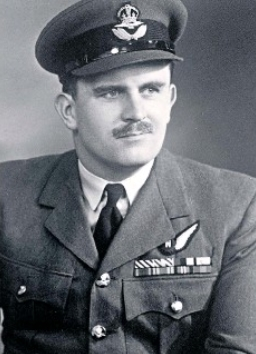
Rex Sanders

Wing Commander Rex Southern Sanders DFC AFC & Bar OBE (14 December 1922 – 10 May 2017) was a Royal Air Force navigator who won a DFC for his service in the Second World War and an AFC for his part in secret photographic and radar reconnaissance missions over the Soviet Union in the 1950s in the Cold War.

== Life ==
Sanders, who was born in London, joined the Royal Air Force in April 1941 and was trained as a navigator in Canada. He took part in 33 bombing runs, including Berlin, as part of 78 Squadron. After the war, Sanders was selected for training in a 'Special Flight' who undertook training in Louisiana on USAF RB-45C aircraft. After the training, the aircraft were flown to an RAF base in Norfolk, England, and given RAF roundels and the applicable colour schemes. Several missions were then flown with Sanders acting as navigator and photographic operative.

In April 1954, whilst flying a reconnaissance mission over Kiev, the aircraft was targeted by the Soviet air defence and MiG fighters were scrambled to try and intercept the RB-45C, but the MiGs could not reach the same height as Sanders' bomber (36,000 feet (11,000 m)).

In later years, Sanders specialised in guided weapons (most notably the Thor programme) and also acted as an advisor to the Pakistan Air Force. He retired from active service in 1977, when he was awarded his OBE.
