= IL-22 =

IL-22 or IL 22 or IL22 may refer to:

- Interleukin 22
- Illinois's 22nd congressional district, an obsolete district in the USA
- Illinois Route 22, USA
- Ilyushin Il-22, a Russian jet bomber aircraft prototype flown in 1947
- Ilyushin Il-22, the airborne command post version of the Russian turboprop airliner Ilyushin Il-18
