= Martin XB-48 =

American bomber prototype

XB-48
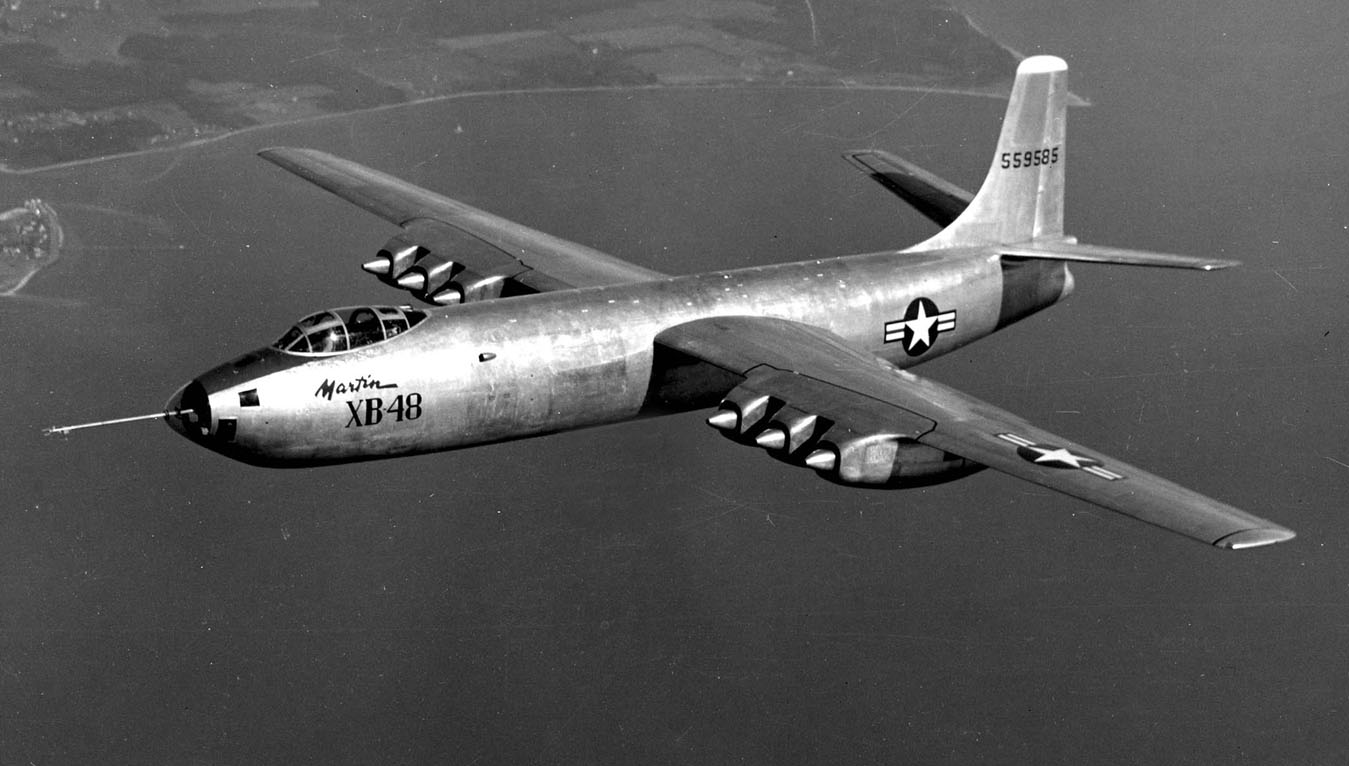

General information
- Type: Bomber
- Manufacturer: Glenn L. Martin Company
- Status: Canceled in 1948
- Number built: 2

History
- First flight: 22 June 1947

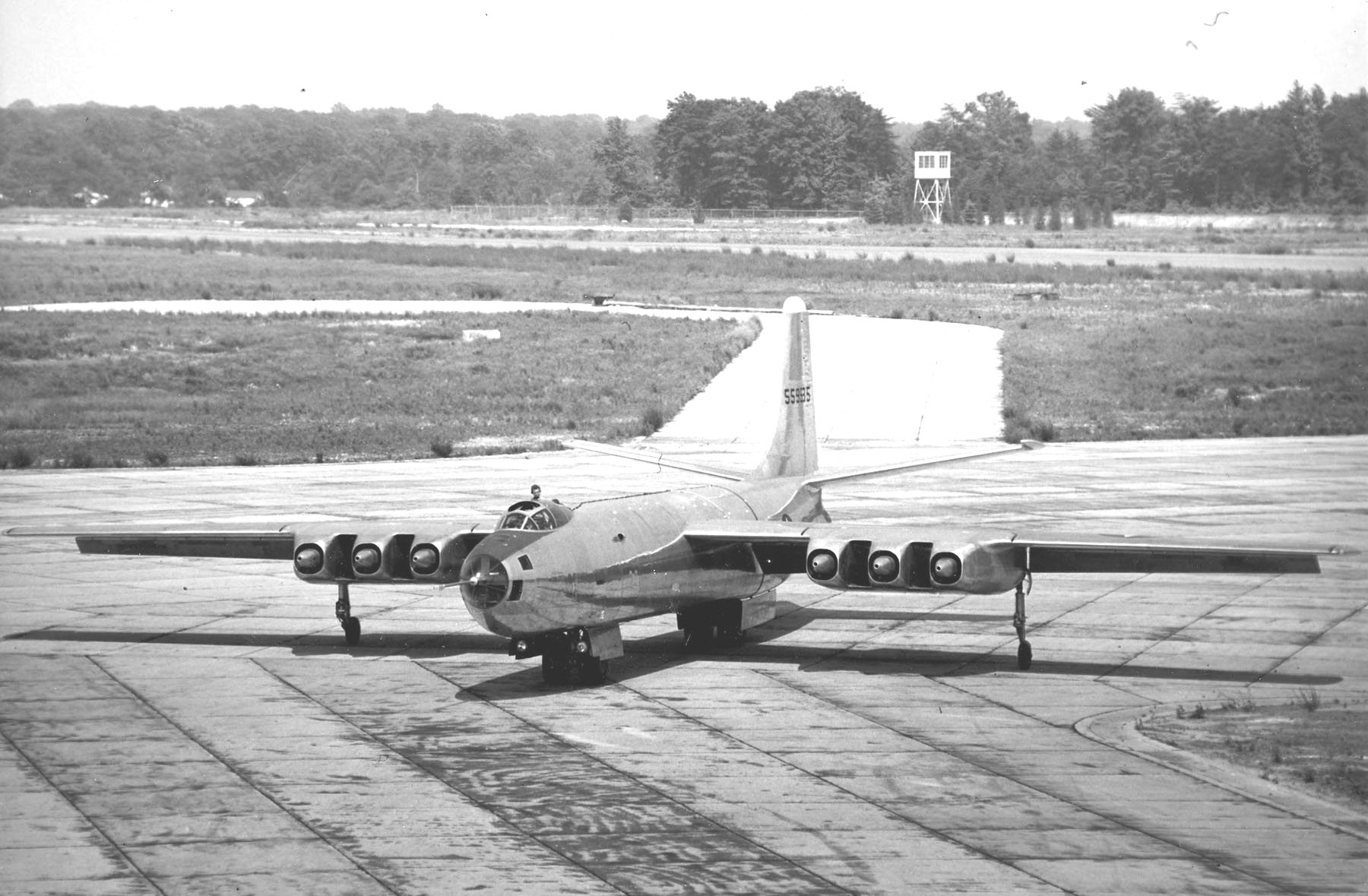
Martin XB-48 prototype taxiing, showing spaces between engines for cooling, tandem main gear, and nacelle outriggers

The Martin XB-48 was an American medium jet bomber developed in the mid-1940s. It competed with the Boeing B-47 Stratojet, which proved to be a superior design, and was largely considered as a backup plan in case the B-47 ran into development problems. It never saw production or active duty, and only two prototypes, serial numbers 45-59585 and 45-59586, were built.

== Design and development ==
In 1944, the U.S. War Department was aware of aviation advances in Germany and issued a requirement for a range of designs for medium bombers weighing from 80,000 pounds (36,000 kg) to more than 200,000 pounds (91,000 kg). Other designs resulting from this competition, sometimes nicknamed "The Class of '45", included the North American XB-45 and the Convair XB-46.

All of the bombers comprising the Class of '45 were transitional aircraft, which combined the power of turbojets with the aeronautical design of World War II, notably the unswept wings and tail surfaces. The XB-48 was no exception, as its round fuselage and unswept wings showed a distinct influence of Martin's B-26 Marauder medium bomber.

At the time of the XB-48's design, jet propulsion was still in its infancy. While the B-26 had enough thrust with two massive 18-cylinder radial engines, the XB-48 needed no less than six of the low-thrust turbojets available at the time. And, although it appeared superficially to have six separate engine nacelles – that is, three under each wing – the XB-48 actually had only two, unusually wide, three-engined nacelles. Each of these large nacelles also contained an intricate set of air ducts that constituted the engines' cooling system.

The XB-48 was the first aircraft designed with bicycle-type tandem landing gear, which had previously been tested on a modified B-26. The wing airfoil was too thin to house conventional landing gear mechanisms. The main landing gear was in the fuselage and small outriggers located on each wing were used to balance the aircraft.

During development, Boeing was using German swept-wing research to develop the dramatically more capable Boeing B-47 Stratojet for the same role. As this outperformed all of the Class of '45, development of the XB-48 continued only as a backup in case the B-47 ran into problems, which did not occur. The only member of the '45 to be put into production was the North American B-45 Tornado, which only served for a few years as a bomber before being replaced by the B-47.

== Operational history ==
The XB-48 made its first flight on 22 June 1947, a 37-minute, 73 mi (117 km) hop from Martin's Baltimore, Maryland plant to NAS Patuxent River, Maryland, but blew all four tires on its fore-and-aft mounted undercarriage on landing when pilot Pat Tibbs applied heavy pressure to the specially designed, but very slow to respond, insensitive air-braking lever. Tibbs and co-pilot Dutch Gelvin were uninjured.

== Specifications (XB-48) ==
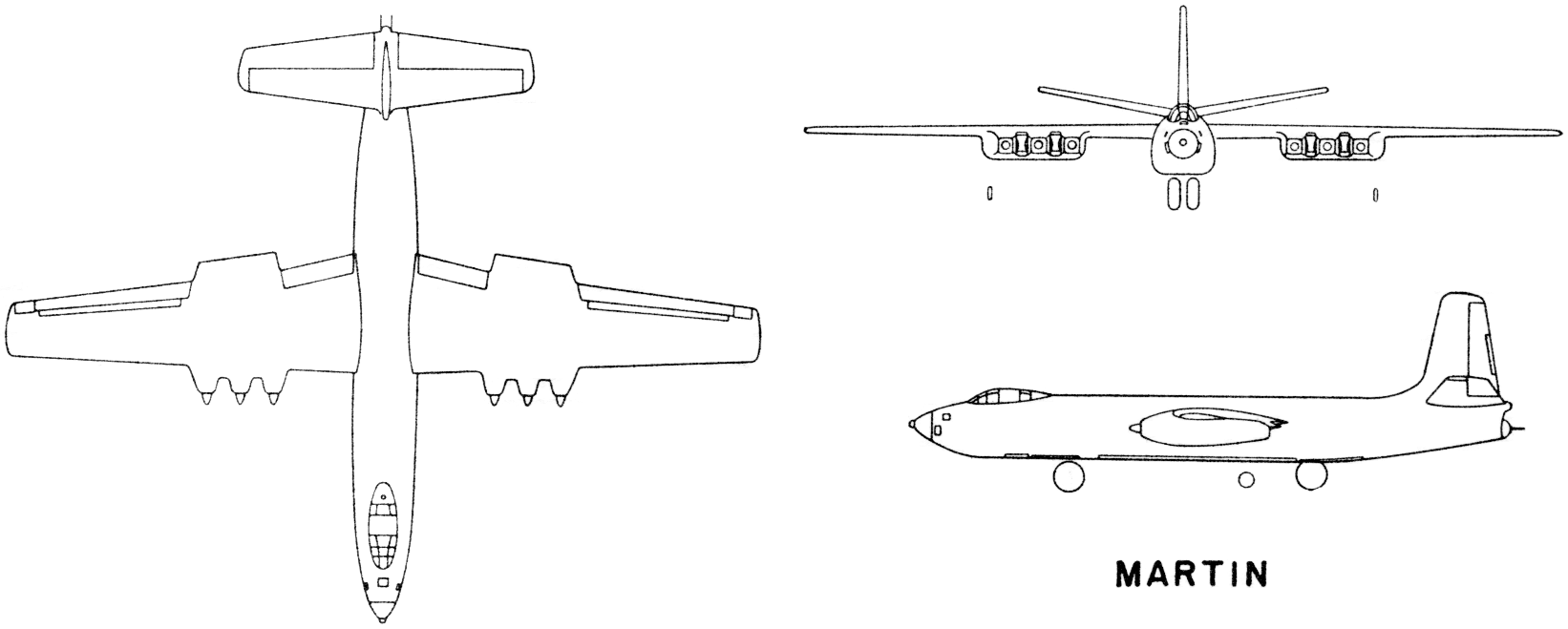
3-view line drawing of the Martin XB-48

Data from "Encyclopedia of US Air Force Aircraft and Missile Systems, Volume II"

General characteristics

- Crew: three (pilot, co-pilot, and bomber-navigator)
- Length: 85 ft 9 in (26.14 m)
- Wingspan: 108 ft 4 in (33.02 m)
- Height: 26 ft 6 in (8.08 m)
- Wing area: 1,330 sq ft (123.5 m^{2})
- Empty weight: 58,500 lb (26,535 kg)
- Gross weight: 92,600 lb (42,000 kg)
- Max takeoff weight: 102,600 lb (46,540 kg)
- Powerplant: 6 × General Electric J35 axial flow turbojet, 3,820 lbf (17.0 kN) thrust each

Performance

- Maximum speed: 454 kn (523 mph, 841 km/h) at 35,000 ft
- Cruise speed: 361 kn (415 mph, 668 km/h)
- Range: 1,566 nmi (1,802 mi, 2,900 km)
- Combat range: 691 nmi (795 mi, 1,280 km)
- Service ceiling: 39,400 ft (12,000 m)
- Rate of climb: 4,200 ft/min (21 m/s)

Armament

- Guns: 2 × .50 in (12.7 mm) M-2 machine guns in tail turret (proposed)
- Bombs: 1 × 20,000 lb (9,980 kg) or 36 × 250 lb (113 kg)

== See also ==
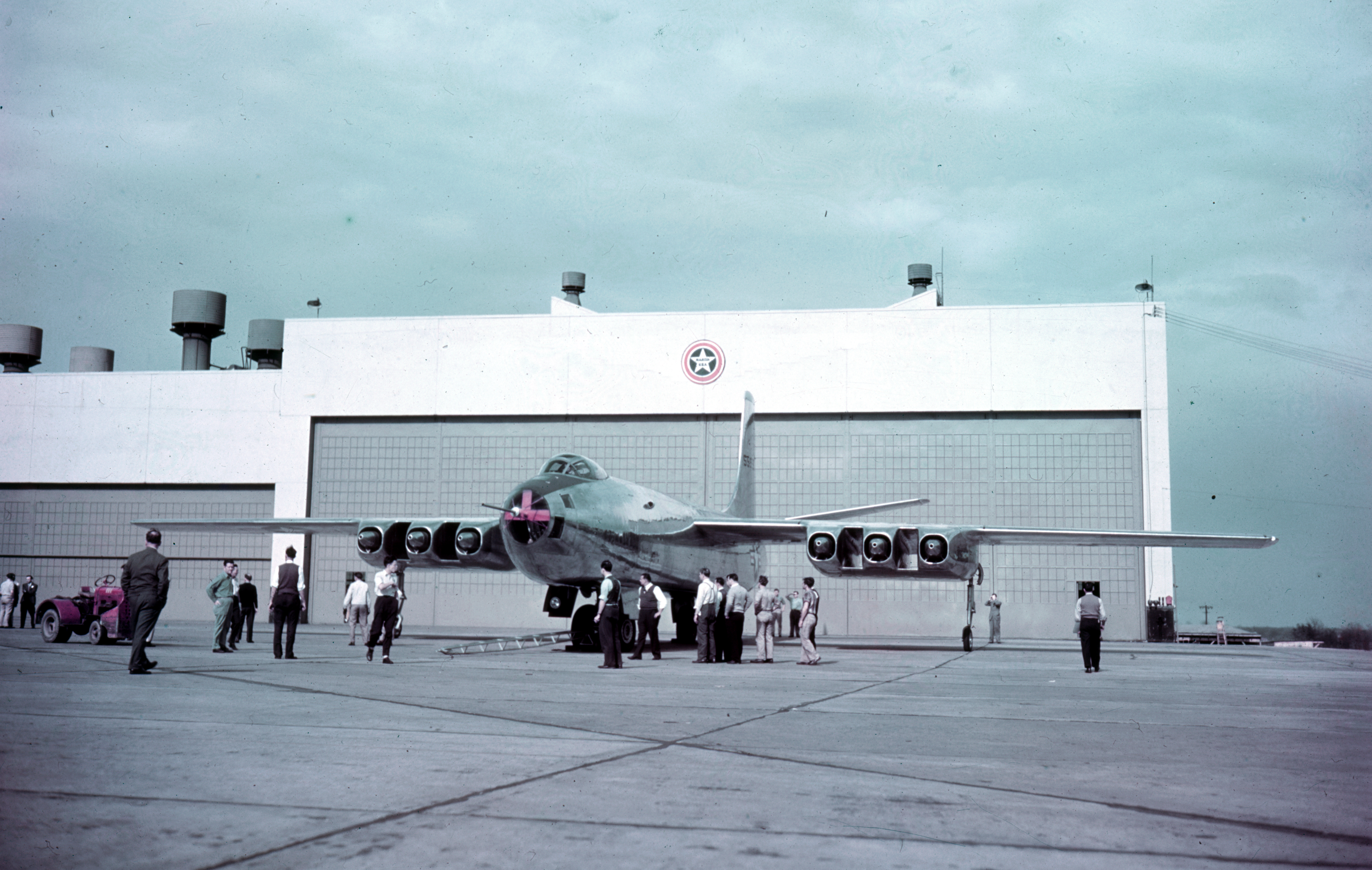
XB-48 prototype

Aircraft of comparable role, configuration, and era

- Boeing B-47 Stratojet
- Convair XB-46
- English Electric Canberra
- Ilyushin Il-22
- Ilyushin Il-28
- North American B-45 Tornado

Related lists

- List of bomber aircraft
- List of military aircraft of the United States
