= Allison J35 =

Axial-flow compressor jet engine

J35
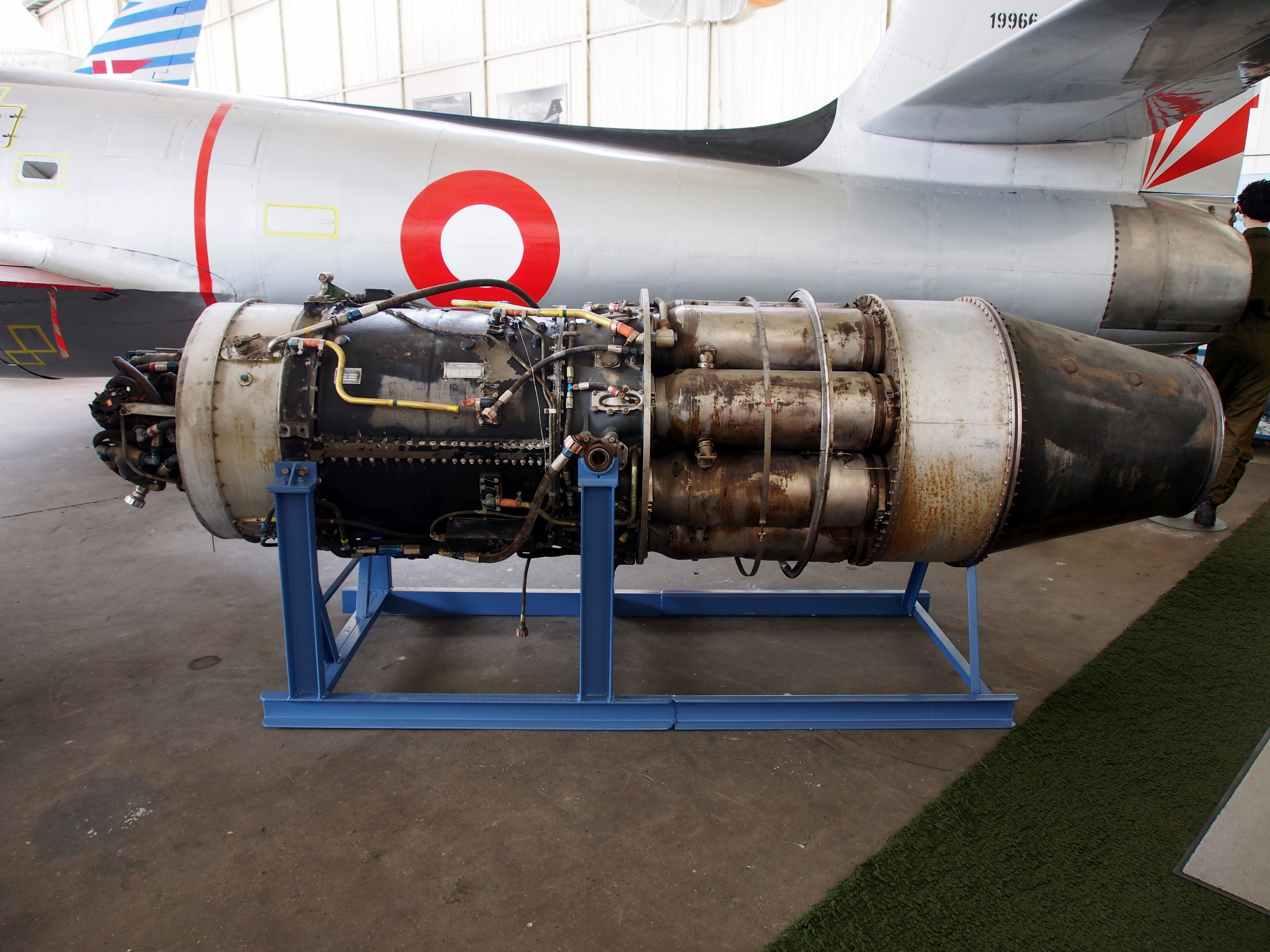
- An Allison J35 at Aalborg, Denmark
- Type: Turbojet
- National origin: United States
- Manufacturer: General Electric; Allison Engine Company
- First run: 1946
- Major applications: North American FJ-1 Fury; Northrop F-89 Scorpion; Northrop YB-49; Republic F-84 Thunderjet
- Number built: 14,000
- Developed into: Allison J71; General Electric J47

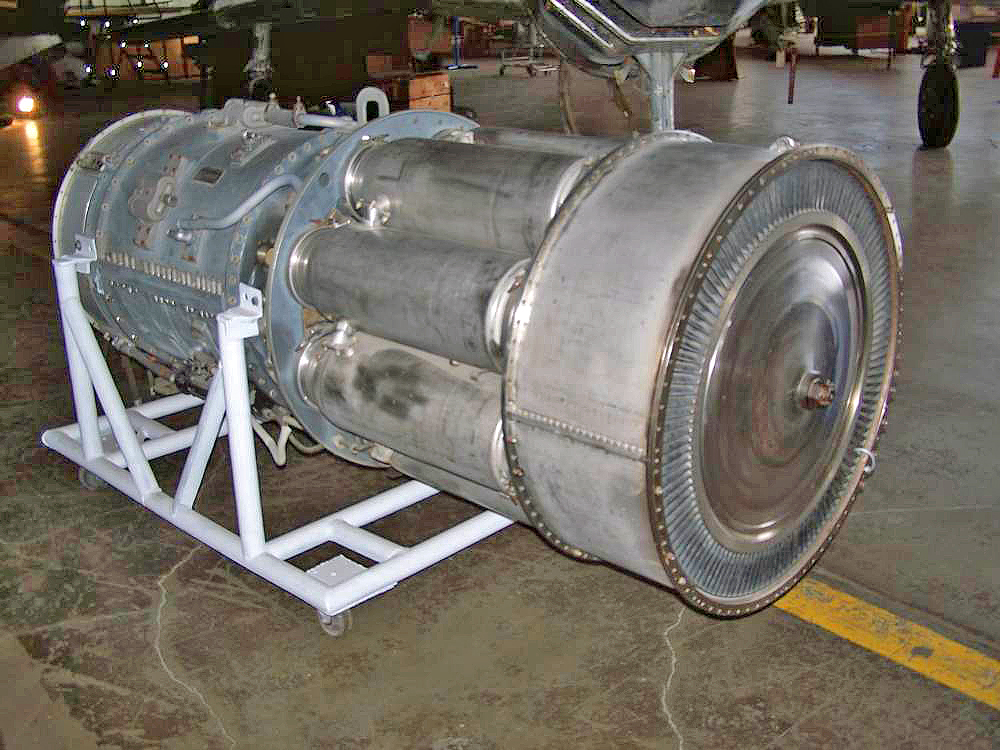
A J35 with exhaust duct removed, exposing the power turbine.

The General Electric/Allison J35 was the United States Air Force's first axial-flow (straight-through airflow) compressor jet engine. Originally developed by General Electric (GE company designation TG-180) in parallel with the Whittle-based centrifugal-flow J33, the J35 was a fairly simple turbojet, consisting of an eleven-stage axial-flow compressor and a single-stage turbine. With the afterburner, which most models carried, it produced a thrust of 7,400 lbf (33 kN).

Like the J33, the design of the J35 originated at General Electric, but major production was by the Allison Engine Company.

== Design and development ==
While developing the T31 axial turboprop in 1943 General Electric realized that they had the resources to design an axial flow turbojet at the same time as their centrifugal-flow J33 engine. They recognized the axial would have more potential for the future and went ahead with the TG-180 engine. GE axial compressor designs were developed from the NACA 8-stage compressor.

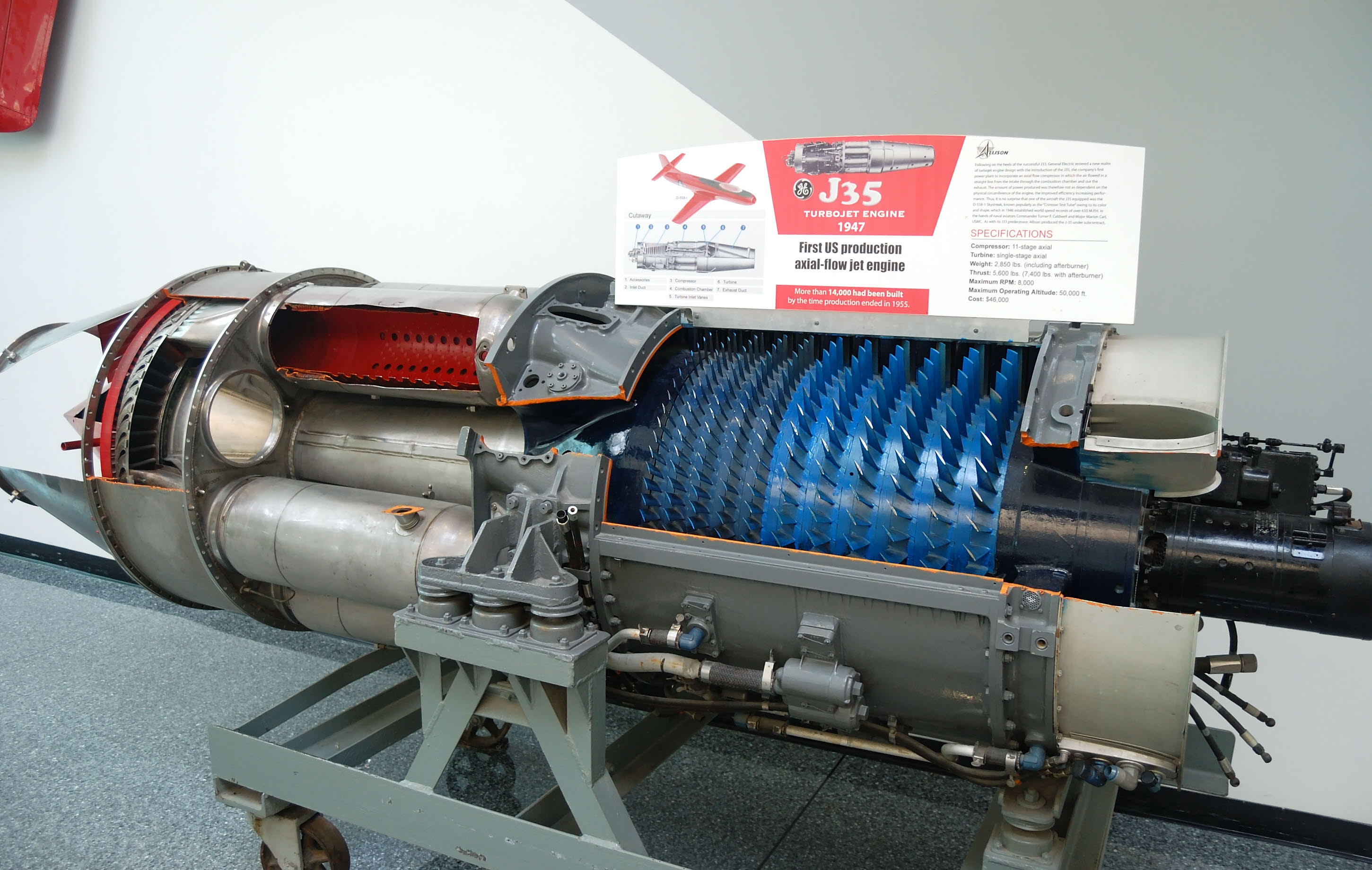
Sectioned J35 at the National Naval Aviation Museum, Pensacola, FL. The 11-stage compressor is painted blue (the stators have been removed), the combustors are red, the turbine is unpainted. The teardrop-shaped openings along the outer edge of the turbine are the air channels used to cool the blades.

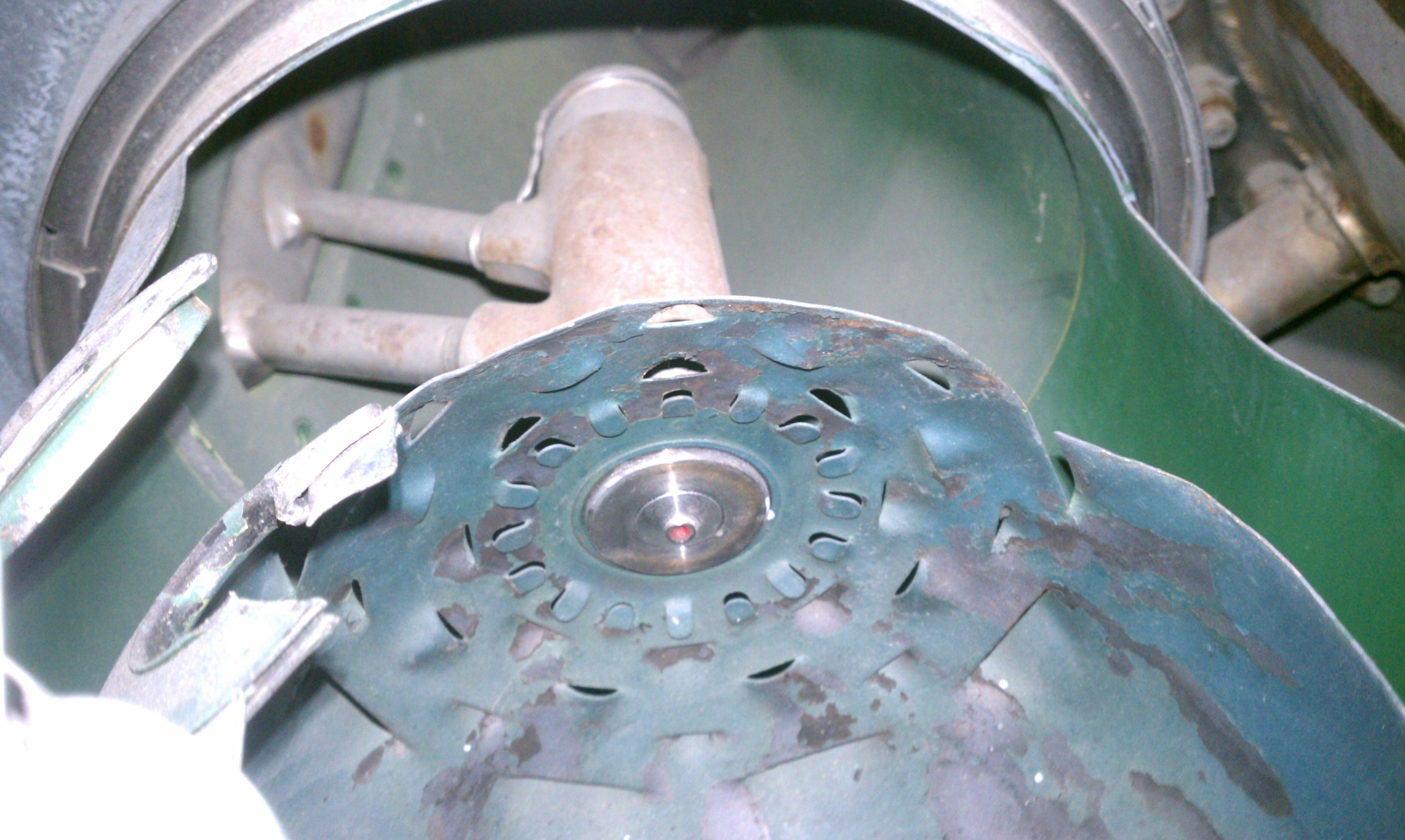
Cutaway of J35 combustor dome

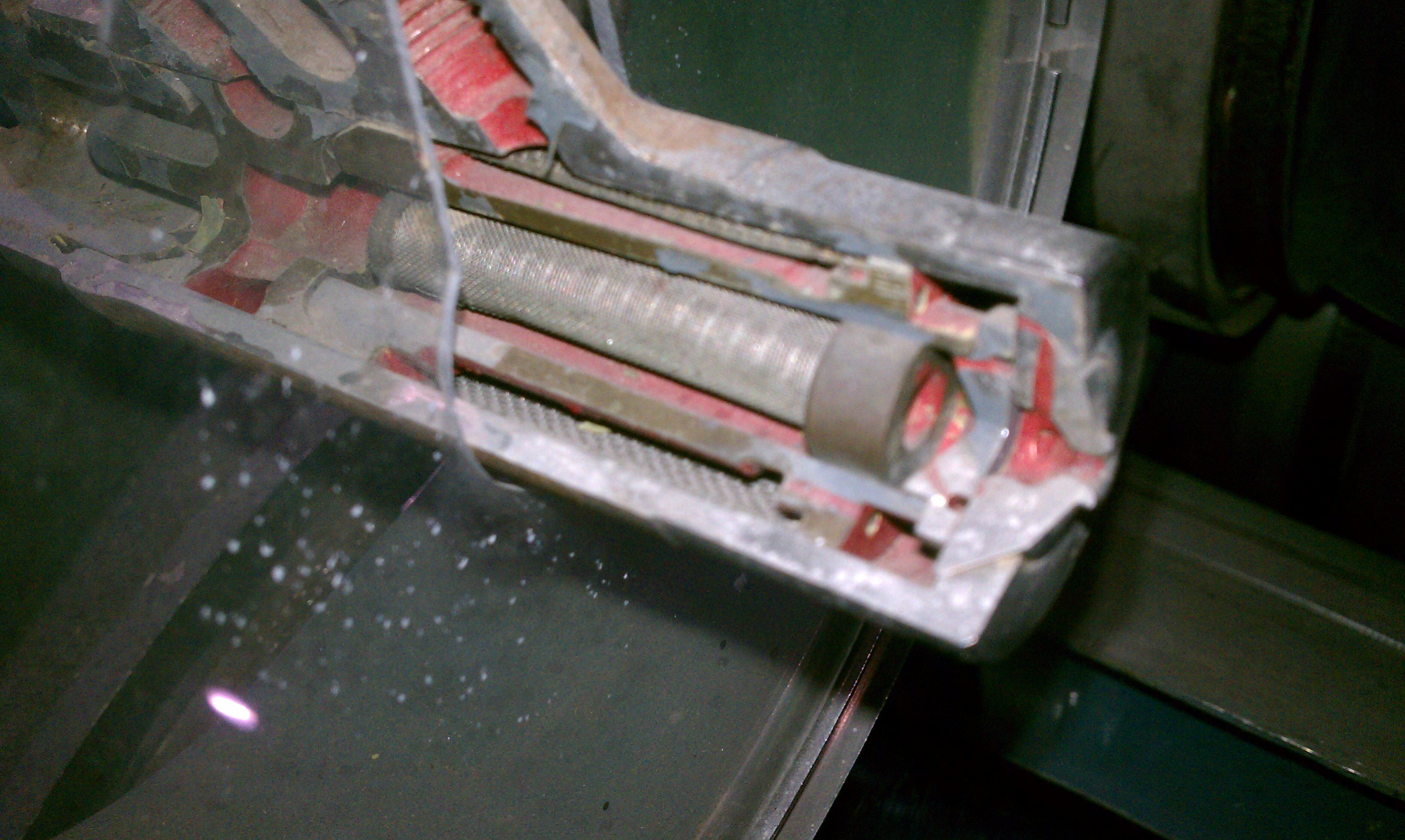
Cutaway of J35 fuel atomizer

The engine had its starter and accessories (fuel control, fuel pump, oil pumps, hydraulic pump, RPM generator) mounted in the center of the compressor inlet. This accessory layout, as used on centrifugal engines, restricted the area available for compressor inlet air. It was carried over to the J47 but revised (relocated to an external gearbox) on the J73 when a 50% increase in airflow was required. It also had an inlet debris guard which was common on early jet engines.

GE developed a variable afterburner for the engine, although electronic control linked with engine controls had to wait until the J47. Marrett describes one of the potential consequences of manual control of the engine and afterburner on a turbine engine: if the afterburner lit but the pilot failed to ensure the nozzle opened, the RPM governor could overfuel the engine until the turbine failed.

== Operational history ==
The General Electric J35 first flew in the Republic XP-84 Thunderjet in 1946. Late in 1947, complete responsibility for the development and production of the engine was transferred to the Allison Division of the General Motors Corporation and some J35s were also built by GM's Chevrolet division. More than 14,000 J35s had been built by the time production ended in 1955.

The J35 was used to power the Bell X-5 variable-sweep research aircraft and various prototypes such as the Douglas XB-43 Jetmaster, North American XB-45 Tornado, Convair XB-46, Boeing XB-47 Stratojet, Martin XB-48, and Northrop YB-49. It is probably best known, however, as the engine used in two of the leading fighters of the United States Air Force (USAF) in the 1950s: the Republic F-84 Thunderjet and the Northrop F-89 Scorpion.

A largely redesigned development, the J35-A-23, was later produced as the Allison J71, developing 10,900 lbf (48.49 kN) thrust.

== Variants ==
Data from: Aircraft Engines of the World 1953, Aircraft Engines of the World 1950

Thrust given in foot-pounds (lbf) and kilonewtons (kN).

J35-GE-2
3,820 lbf (17.0 kN), prototypes built by General Electric.
J35-GE-7
3,745 lbf (16.66 kN), built by General Electric, powered the two Republic XP-84 Thunderjet prototypes
J35-GE-15
4,000 lbf (18 kN), built by General Electric, powered the sole Republic XP-84A Thunderjet
J35-A-3
4,000 lbf (18 kN)
J35-C-3
3,820 lbf (17.0 kN), production by Chevrolet.
J35-C-3
4,000 lbf (18 kN), production by Chevrolet.
J35-A-4
Similar to -29, 4,000 lbf (18 kN)
J35-A-5
4,000 lbf (18 kN)
J35-A-9
4,000 lbf (18 kN)
J35-A-11
Similar to -29, 6,000 lbf (27 kN)
J35-A-13
5,200 lbf (23 kN)
J35-A-13C
J35-A-15
Similar to -29, 4,000 lbf (18 kN), powered the 15 Republic YP-84 Thunderjets
J35-A-15C
4,000 lbf (18 kN)
J35-A-17
Similar to -29, 4,900 lbf (22 kN)
J35-A-17A
Similar to -29, 5,000 lbf (22 kN)
J35-A-17D
5,000 lbf (22 kN)
J35-A-19
Similar to -17, 5,000 lbf (22 kN)
J35-A-21
Similar to -35, 5,600 lbf (25 kN) / 7,400 lbf (33 kN) with afterburner
J35-A-21A
Similar to -35, 5,600 lbf (25 kN) / 7,400 lbf (33 kN) with afterburner
J35-A-23
Similar to -29, 10,900 lbf (48 kN) / original designation for the Allison J71
J35-A-25
Similar to -29, 5,000 lbf (22 kN)
J35-A-29
5,560 lbf (24.7 kN), powered Republic F-84G Thunderjet
J35-A-33
Similar to -35, 5,600 lbf (25 kN) / 7,400 lbf (33 kN) with afterburner, without anti-icing
J35-A-33A
Similar to -35, 5,600 lbf (25 kN) / 7,400 lbf (33 kN) with afterburner, without anti-icing
J35-A-35
5,440 lbf (24.2 kN) / 7,200 lbf (32 kN) with afterburner
J35-A-41
Similar to -35, 5,600 lbf (25 kN) / 7,400 lbf (33 kN) with afterburner, with anti-icing
Model 450
company designation for J35 series engines.
General Electric 7E-TG-180-XR-17A
ca 1,740 hp (1,300 kW) gas power, gas generator for the Hughes XH-17.

== Applications ==
- Bell X-5
- Boeing XB-47 Stratojet
- Convair XB-46
- Douglas D-558-1 Skystreak
- Douglas XB-43 Jetmaster
- Fiat G.84 (proposal only)
- Hughes XH-17 (experimental helicopter)
- Martin XB-48
- North American FJ-1 Fury
- North American XB-45 Tornado
- North American XP-86 Sabre
- Northrop F-89 Scorpion
- Northrop YB-49
- Republic F-84 Thunderjet
- Vought F7U-3 Cutlass (interim test usage)

== Engines on display ==
- Allison J35 is on public display at Texas Air Museum - Stinson Chapter, San Antonio, Texas
- Allison J35 is on public display at San Jose State University, San Jose, California
- Allison J35 is on public display at Flyhistorisk Museum, Sola, Norway

== Specifications (J35-A-35) ==
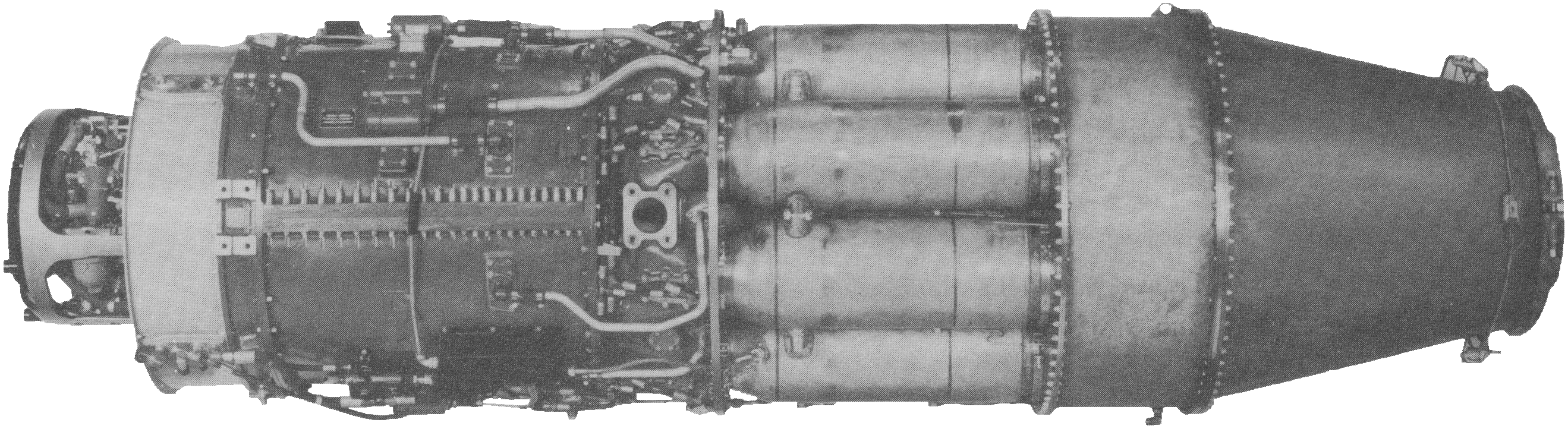
J35-A-9 profile view

Data from , Aircraft engines of the World 1957

==== General characteristics ====
- Type: Afterburning turbojet
- Length: 195.5 in (4,970 mm) including afterburner
- Diameter: 37 in (940 mm)
- Frontal area: 7.5 sq ft (0.70 m^{2})
- Dry weight: 2,315 lb (1,050 kg) without afterburner; 2,930 lb (1,330 kg) including afterburner

==== Components ====
- Compressor: 11-stage axial compressor
- Combustors: eight tubular inter-connected combustion chambers
- Turbine: single-stage axial turbine
- Fuel type: aviation kerosene, JP-4, MIL-F-5624 or 100/130 octane gasoline
- Oil system: dry sump pressure system with spur gear pressure and scavenge pumps at 35 psi (240 kPa)

==== Performance ====
- Maximum thrust: (dry): 5,600 lbf (25 kN) for take-off at 8,000 rpm
- Maximum thrust (wet): 7,500 lbf (33 kN) for take-off at 8,000 rpm
- Overall pressure ratio: 5:1
- Air mass flow: 95 lb/s (2,600 kg/min) at take-off power
- Specific fuel consumption: 1.1 lb/(lbf⋅h) (31 g/(kN⋅s)) dry; 2 lb/(lbf⋅h) (57 g/(kN⋅s)) wet
- Thrust-to-weight ratio: 2.63
- Maximum operating altitude: 50,000 ft (15,000 m)
- Cost: US$ 46,000 each

== See also ==
Related development

- Allison J71
- General Electric T31
- General Electric J47

Comparable engines

- Rolls-Royce Avon
- Tumansky RD-9

Related lists

- List of aircraft engines
