= Ilyushin Il-22 =

1947 Soviet bomber aircraft prototype

- Ilyushin Il-22 in front view

General information
- Type: Bomber
- National origin: Soviet Union
- Manufacturer: Ilyushin
- Status: Prototype
- Number built: 1

History
- First flight: 22 July 1947

The Ilyushin Il-22, USAF/DOD designation Type 10, was the first Soviet jet-engined bomber to fly. It used four Lyulka TR-1 turbojets carried on short horizontal pylons ahead and below the wing. The engines did not meet their designed thrust ratings and their fuel consumption was higher than planned. These problems meant that the aircraft could not reach its required performance and it was cancelled on 22 September 1947.

== Design and development ==
The Council of Ministers ordered the Ilyushin design bureau on 12 February 1946 to begin work on a bomber that would use four of the new TR-1 jet engines. Experiences with the first generation of jet fighters had revealed unsuspected problems involved with high-speed flight and Ilyushin devoted much effort to mitigate them. The long and thin unswept wing was conventional in appearance, but it was shaped to improve lateral stability at high angles of attack and to prevent the onset of tip stall.

Another problem discovered by the jet fighters was unexpectedly dropping a wing at high speeds and high altitudes. This was traced to manufacturing defects in the wings that made no difference at low speeds and altitudes, but meant that each wing had a slightly different airfoil and, hence, a different amount of lift. To counter this Sergey Ilyushin and his team developed a new manufacturing technique that reversed the traditional practice where the internal supporting members were affixed to the assembly jig and the aircraft's skin panels were then attached. This new method meant that the skin panels were placed in the jigs where the correct curvature and shape could be guaranteed and the internal structure was then fastened to them. This required that manufacturing joints be used along the chord lines of the wings and tail surfaces, which split the spars and ribs in half. Similarly, the fuselage was built the same way, although it was split vertically along the centerline. This new technique did impose a small weight penalty but had the unexpected advantage of greatly accelerating the assembly process, as the internal equipment could be installed before the halves were joined together. This allowed several teams to work on a single sub-assembly before they were mated.

Most of the other multi-engined jet aircraft in existence, when the Il-22 was being designed, either had the engines in a nacelle (singly or in pairs) directly attached to the underside of the wing or were buried in the wing itself. Clustering them in a nacelle offered several advantages over individual nacelles, as it reduced overall drag and minimized interference drag, but had the major operational disadvantage that an uncontained fire in one engine could disable its neighbor as well. Early jet engines were not reliable, so this was a significant risk. Ilyushin chose to put the TR-1 engines ahead and below the wing leading edge on short horizontal pylons. This gave them the beneficial effect of acting as anti-flutter weights and proved to be more efficient aerodynamically than underwing nacelles. This also facilitated engine changes and maintenance by making them more accessible to the ground crews.

Neither the thin wing nor the engine nacelles offered any place to store the main landing gear so the fuselage was designed as a flattened oval to give them as wide a track as possible. This also provided plenty of room for the 9,300 kg (20,500 lb) of fuel stored in three bags, one each ahead, above and behind the bomb bay. This could carry up to 3,000 kg (6,600 lb) of bombs. The stepless fuselage nose was largely glazed and came to a rounded point (similar to the noses of the Boeing B-29 Superfortress, Heinkel He 111 and Arado Ar 234) to reduce drag. The Il-22 had a crew of five, two pilots in the nose, the bombardier-navigator in front of them in the tip of the nose, the dorsal gunner/radio operator immediately behind the pilots and the rear turret gunner behind the tail.

A 23-millimetre (0.91 in) Nudelman-Suranov NS-23 autocannon with 150 rounds was fixed on the lower starboard side of the nose; it was fired by the pilot who had a primitive ring sight to use for aiming. The dorsal turret mounted two 20-millimetre (0.79 in) Berezin B-20E guns with 400 rounds per gun and was capable of 360° of traverse, with special microswitches preventing the gunner from firing into the bomber's tail. The turret was remotely controlled by the radio operator and was powered by electric motors for both traverse and elevation. The gunner and his gunsight used a small observation blister at the rear of the main crew compartment to lay the guns on their target. The sight automatically compensated for parallax between the gunner and the turret as well as the required amount of target lead and the shell's ballistics. The remote-control system offered several advantages including a smaller turret that had less drag, the guns could be fixed more rigidly to their mounts, the sight was not exposed to vibrations from firing and could track targets more smoothly and the gunner's comfort did not have to be sacrificed to optimize the performance of the turret. The major disadvantage, of course, was that the analog computer remote control system was exceedingly complicated for the period and prone to breaking down, just like the even more complex systems in use on the B-29 Superfortress. The rear gunner was placed at the very tail of the Il-22 to optimize his field of fire in an electro-hydraulically powered Il-KU3 turret that mounted another NS-23 cannon. The turret could traverse a total of 140°, elevate 35° and depress 30°.

== Testing and evaluation ==
The prototype Il-22 was rapidly assembled and made its first flight on 24 July 1947. It proved to have docile handling characteristics, but was severely underpowered as the TR-1 engines produced only 80% of the required thrust. During the latter part of the manufacturer's flight tests the Il-22 made the first-ever Soviet jet-assisted (rocket-assisted, RATO) takeoff on 7 February 1948 with a pair of SR-2 boosters. As the thrust of the engines could not be increased in a timely manner Ilyushin made the decision not to submit the bomber for state acceptance trials as its performance did not meet the requirements laid down for it in 1946.

== Specifications (Il-22) ==
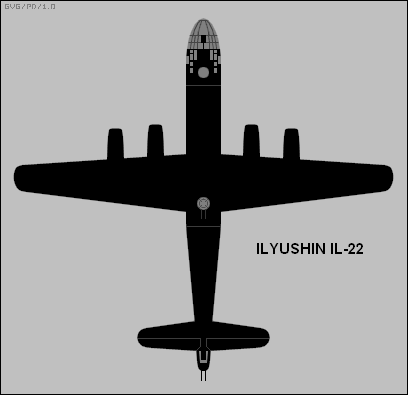
Plan view of the Il-22

Data from Early Soviet Jet Bombers

General characteristics

- Length: 21.05 m (69 ft 1 in)
- Wingspan: 23.06 m (75 ft 8 in)
- Wing area: 74.5 m^{2} (802 sq ft)
- Empty weight: 14,950 kg (32,959 lb)
- Gross weight: 20,000 kg (44,092 lb) (design target 24,000 kg (53,000 lb))
- Fuel capacity: 9,300 kg (20,500 lb)
- Powerplant: 4 × Lyul'ka TR-1 axial flow turbojet, 12.75 kN (2,870 lbf) thrust each

Performance

- Maximum speed: 656.5 km/h (407.9 mph, 354.5 kn) at sea level

705 km/h (438 mph; 381 kn) at 5,000 m (16,000 ft)
718 km/h (446 mph; 388 kn) at 7,000 m (23,000 ft)

- Landing Speed: 190 km/h (120 mph; 100 kn)
- Landing Run: 940 m (3,080 ft)
- Take-off Run: 1,144 m (3,753 ft)
- Cruise speed: 485 km/h (301 mph, 262 kn)
- Range: 865 km (537 mi, 467 nmi) with 2,000 kg (4,400 lb) of bombs, at 4,900 m (16,100 ft) at 485 km/h (301 mph; 262 kn)
- Service ceiling: 11,100 m (36,400 ft)
- Time to altitude: 5,000 m (16,000 ft) in 8.6 minutes, 8,000 m (26,000 ft) in 17.4 minutes

Armament

- Guns:
  - 1 × fixed, forward-firing 23 mm (0.906 in) Nudelman-Suranov NS-23
  - 2 × 20 mm (0.787 in) Berezin B-20E gun in the dorsal turret
  - 1 × 23 mm (0.906 in) NS-23 gun in the rear turret
- Bombs: Normal 2,000 kg (4,400 lb), Maximum 3,000 kg (6,600 lb)

== See also ==
Aircraft of comparable role, configuration, and era

- Arado Ar 234
- Convair XB-46
- Heinkel He 343
- Martin XB-48
- North American B-45 Tornado

Related lists

- List of bomber aircraft
