= North American B-45 Tornado =

1947 US bomber aircraft family

B-45 Tornado
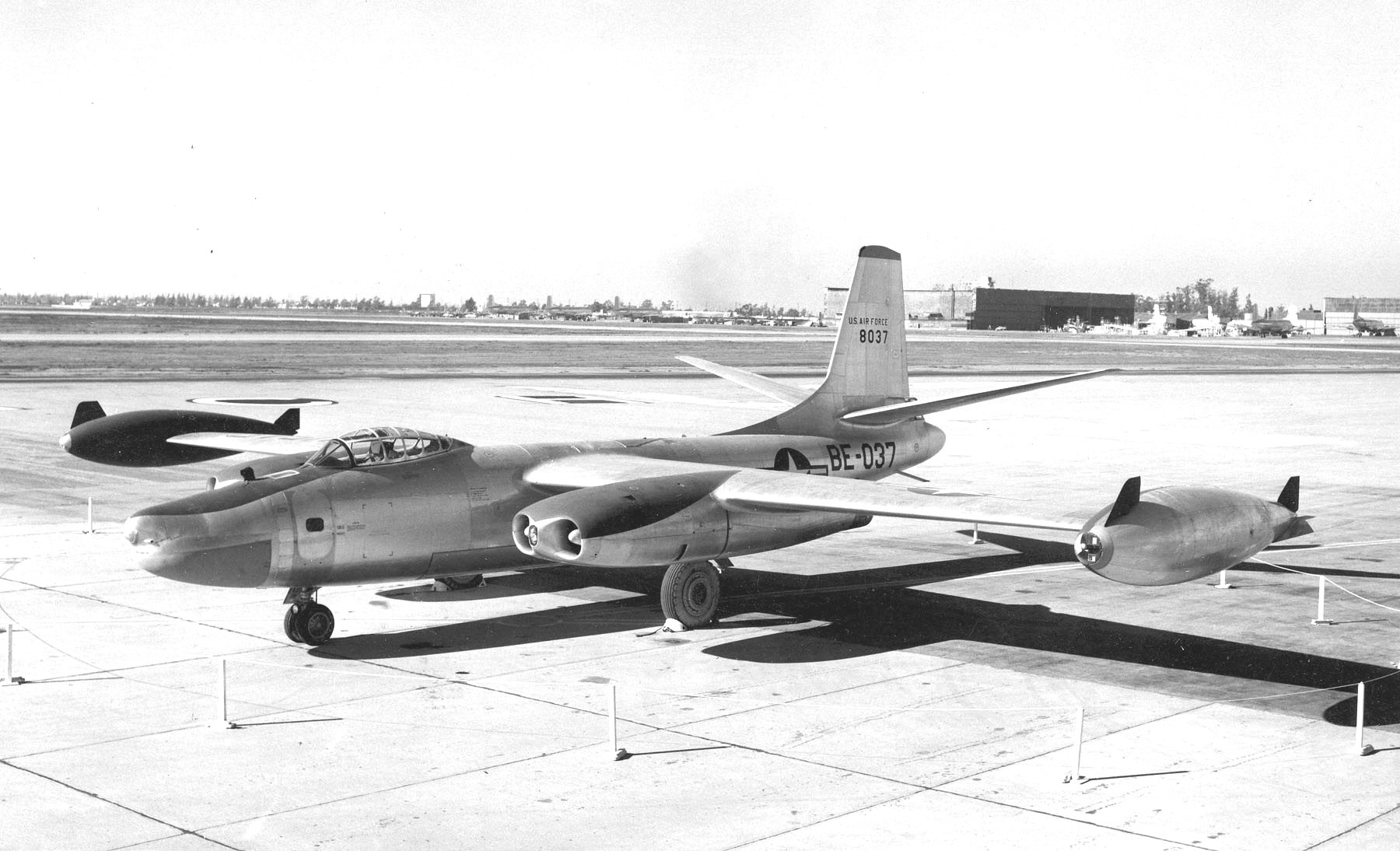
- Static display of RB-45C, AF Ser. No. 48-037

General information
- Type: Strategic bomber
- National origin: United States
- Manufacturer: North American Aviation
- Status: Retired
- Primary users: United States Air Force Royal Air Force
- Number built: 143

History
- Introduction date: 22 April 1948
- First flight: 17 March 1947
- Retired: 1959

The North American B-45 Tornado is an early American jet bomber designed and manufactured by aircraft company North American Aviation. It has the distinction of being the first operational jet bomber to enter service with the United States Air Force (USAF), as well as the first multiengine jet bomber to be refueled in midair. It was the second American jet bomber, after the Douglas XB-43 Jetmaster.

The B-45 originated from a wartime initiative launched by the U.S. War Department, which sought a company to develop a jet-propelled bomber to equal those being fielded by Nazi Germany, such as the Arado Ar 234. Following a competitive review of the submissions, the War Department issued a contract to North American to develop its NA-130 proposal; on 8 September 1944, work commenced on the assembly of three prototypes. Progress on the program was stalled by post-war cutbacks in defense expenditure but regained importance due to growing tensions between America and the Soviet Union. On 2 January 1947, North American received a production contract for the bomber, designated B-45A, from the USAF. On 24 February 1947, the prototype performed its maiden flight.

Soon after its entry to service on 22 April 1948, B-45 operations were troubled by technical problems, in particular poor engine reliability. The USAF found the plane to be useful during the Korean War performing both conventional bombing and aerial reconnaissance missions. On 4 December 1950, the first successful interception of a jet bomber by a jet fighter occurred when a B-45 was shot down by a Soviet-built MiG-15 inside Chinese airspace. During the early 1950s, 40 B-45s were extensively modified so that they could be equipped with nuclear weapons. Improvements were made to their defensive systems and the fuel tankage was expanded to increase their survivability and range.

In its heyday, the B-45 was important to United States defense strategy, performing the strategically critical deterrence mission for several years during the early 1950s, after which the Tornado was superseded by the larger and more capable Boeing B-47 Stratojet. Both B-45 bombers and reconnaissance RB-45s served in the USAF's Strategic Air Command from 1950 until 1959, when the USAF withdrew the last ones in favor of the Convair B-58 Hustler, an early supersonic bomber. The Tornado was also adopted by the Royal Air Force (RAF) and operated from bases in United Kingdom, where it was used to overfly the Soviet Union on intelligence-related missions. Despite being painted with RAF markings and flown by RAF crew, they did not belong to the RAF; the RAF merely operated them on behalf of the United States.

== Development ==
=== Background ===
Development of what would become the B-45 was initiated by a request from the U.S. War Department during World War II. Aviation technology had developed rapidly and the US was eager to introduce the latest advances into the Army Air Forces. Having been alarmed by the emergence of the German jet bomber Arado Ar 234, the War Department issued a request for a new family of jet-powered bombers. During October 1944 the U.S. Army Air Forces (USAAF) issued a mission-need statement and on 17 November 1944, released a formal requirement, which has been claimed to be the first such requirement issued outside of Germany.

The requirements involved more than just jet propulsion; the desired aircraft would have a gross weight of between 80,000 lb (36,287 kg) and 200,000 lb (90,718 kg), which would make it a light bomber for that era. Aircraft manufacturer North American Aviation chose to submit their own design, internally designated NA-130. This bid, along with three rival proposals from other firms, would be ordered by the government. On 8 September 1944, the company commenced production of three prototypes based on its NA-130 design. According to aviation authors Bill Gunston and Peter Gilchrist, the NA-130 was viewed as "merely a traditional bomber on to which jet engines had been fitted...the first effective jet bomber in the world, a case of the right aircraft at the right time".

The end of the war resulted in the cancellation or delay of many projects. In 1946, rising tension with the Soviet Union impelled the USAAF to assign a higher priority to jet bomber development. By mid-1946, both the XB-45 and the rival Convair XB-46 were nearing completion but the Boeing XB-47 and Martin XB-48 were at least two years out. Thus, the USAAF chose to evaluate the first two designs. The B-45 proved to be at a more advanced development stage and less expensive. Accordingly, on 2 January 1947, a production contract for B-45As was signed. Early plans called for five light bomb groups and three light reconnaissance groups. The B-45 was commonly viewed as an interim aircraft while more advanced designs like the B-47 were being developed.

=== Into flight ===
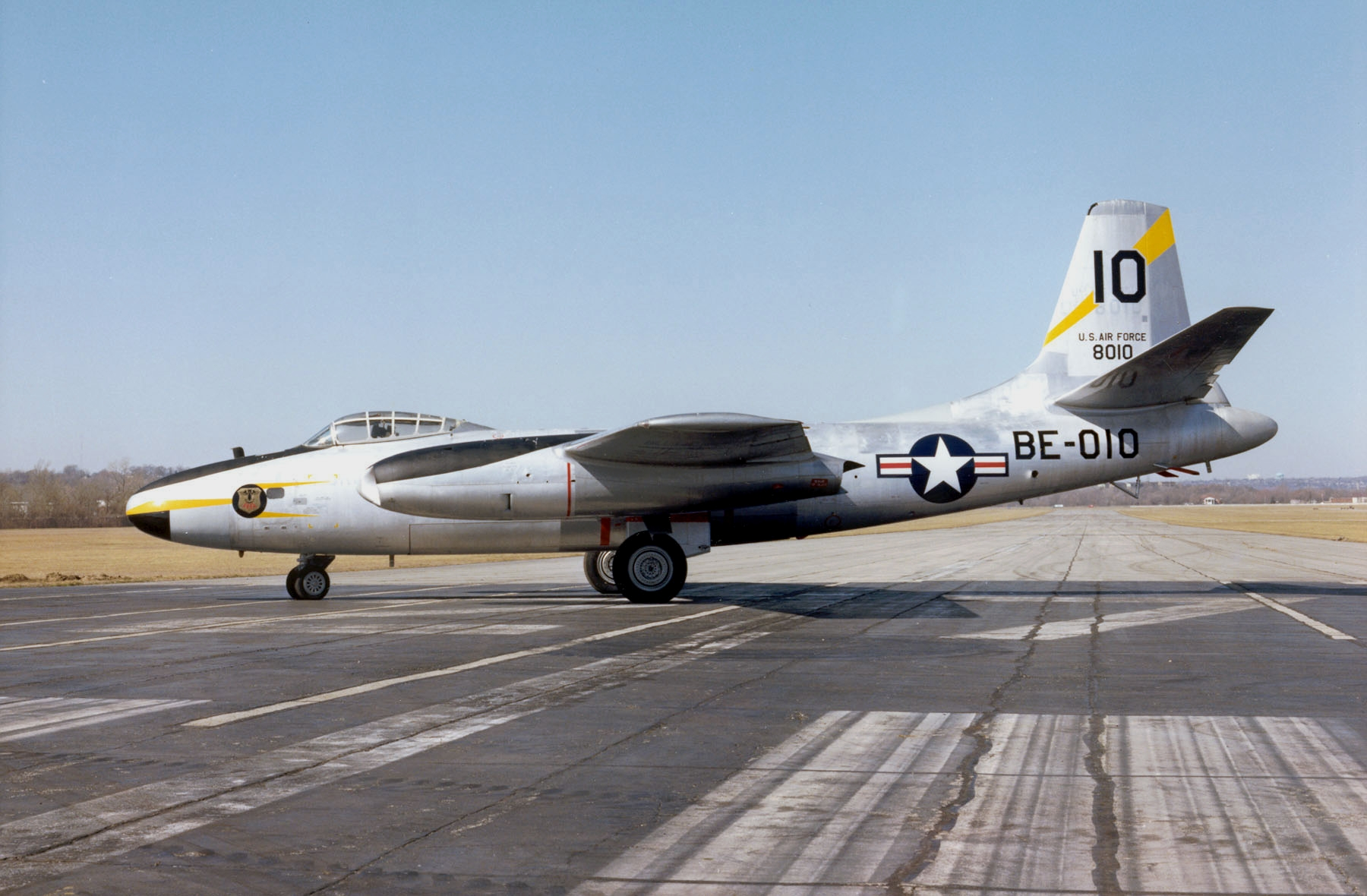
A preserved USAF B-45C Tornado at the National Museum of the U.S. Air Force, Dayton, Ohio

Following the completion of the first prototype at North American's Inglewood facility, it was delivered by road in sections to Muroc Field, where it was reassembled and readied for flight testing. On 17 March 1947, the maiden flight was piloted by George Krebs and Paul Brewer. The flight test program became fraught with technical issues and setbacks, the most dramatic being the loss of the first prototype. Despite the problems, work continued at a frantic pace due to political pressure for the aircraft to be quickly qualified for service.

However, as the development and flight-testing of the rival B-47 proceeded well, heralding its own production, the future of the B-45 became increasingly uncertain. During mid-1948, the U.S. Air Staff began to question its value. Soon afterwards, President Truman's budget restraints reduced Air Force expenditures, which curtailed B-45 production to 142 airframes. During 1950, further budget cuts compelled the Aircraft and Weapons Board to cancel 51 of the 190 aircraft on order. The cancellation of these 51 B-45s was announced on 7 January 1949.

A total of 96 aircraft were delivered between February 1948 and June 1949. Multiple improved versions of the B-45 were proposed by North American, some of which were realized. While the B-45B concept equipped with a radar-guided fire control system would never be ordered, the more advanced B-45C was. This variant featured a strengthened airframe, tip tanks for greater fuel capacity, and more powerful General Electric J47-15 turbojet engines. Only 10 would be delivered from an order of 43. Perhaps the most significant variant was the RB-45C, a dedicated reconnaissance aircraft that lacked a bomb bay; 33 aircraft were delivered. The B-45 was later replaced by the supersonic Convair B-58 Hustler.

== Operational history ==
=== Korean War ===
Early operations of the B-45 were plagued by engine problems which, along with numerous other minor flaws, undermined its usefulness. However, the aircraft regained importance when the United States entered the Korean War in 1950. In this theatre, the B-45 proved its value both as a bomber and as a reconnaissance aircraft. The mass deployment of U.S. forces to the war on the Korean peninsula exposed the vulnerability of North Atlantic Treaty Organization (NATO) forces in Europe to a potential Soviet attack. This realization was a major factor contributing to the USAF's decision regarding the future of the B-45. The B-45, like most post-World War II American bombers, could carry both nuclear and conventional bombs. The progress of weapons technology had led to a great reduction in both the weight and size of nuclear weapons in the U.S. inventory, which enabled smaller aircraft such as the B-45 to carry out nuclear strikes, a mission which had previously been confined to heavy bombers. Suddenly, the small fleet of B-45s once again possessed considerable value as a nuclear deterrent.

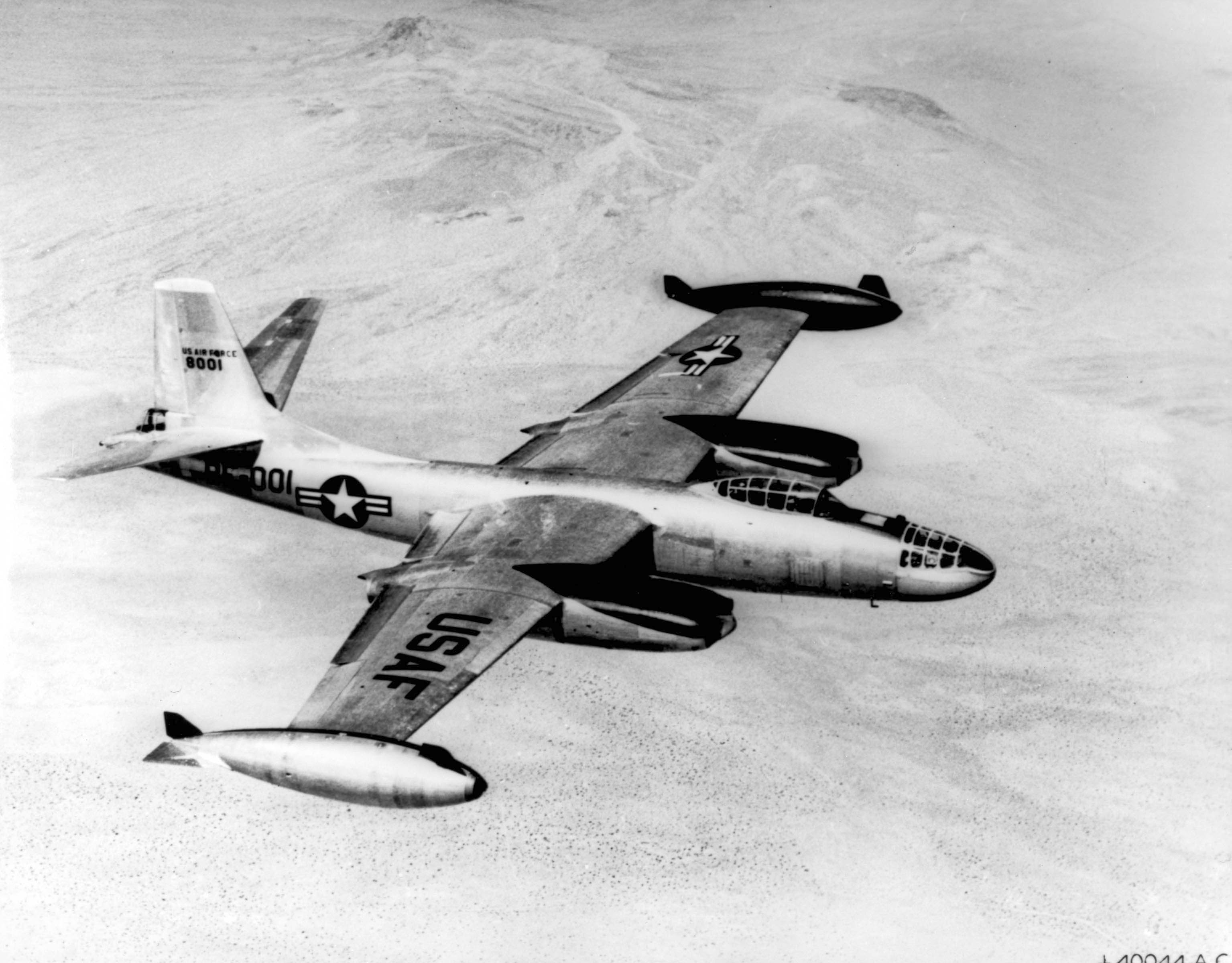
A USAF B-45C Tornado in flight

On 4 December 1950, the first successful interception of a jet bomber by a jet fighter occurred when MiG-15 pilot Aleksandr F. Andrianov shot down an RB-45C over China. Captain Charles McDonough was the only member of the four-man crew to parachute from the plane, although he is believed to have died while being held by either the Chinese or the Soviet Union. Because of the sensitivity typically surrounding such missions, much of the information surrounding this flight and similar intelligence activities has remained classified.

Operation Fandango, sometimes called Operation Backbreaker, modified the aircraft for nuclear missions. The 40 B-45s allocated to the program were equipped with a new defensive system and additional fuel tankage. Despite the magnitude of the modifications project, plus ongoing problems with the jet engines, nuclear-capable B-45s began reaching the United Kingdom in May 1952, and deployment of the 40 aircraft was completed in mid-June. It was at about the same time that RB-45s of the 323rd Strategic Reconnaissance Squadron began to arrive in Japan to fly alongside the 91st Strategic Reconnaissance Squadron, supplementing the World War II-era piston-engine RB-29s which had been easy targets for North Korean MiGs. The RB-45s provided valuable intelligence throughout the remainder of the Korean War, despite the limited number available. RB-45Cs flew many daylight missions until early 1952, when they changed to night operations after an RB-45 was almost lost to a MiG-15.

=== Postwar ===
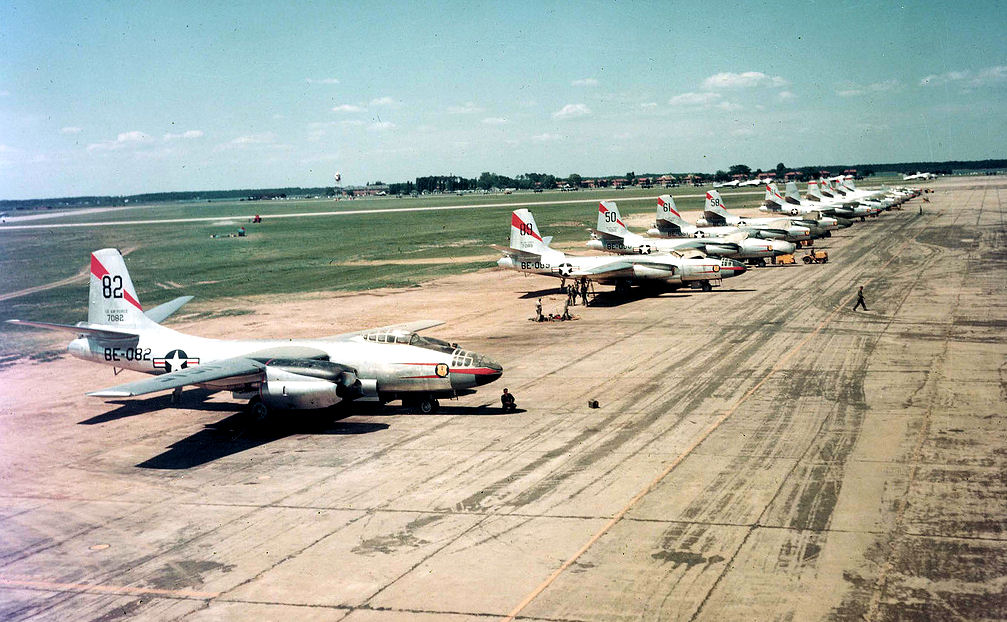
Flightline photo of B-45A-5-NA Tornadoes of the 47th Light Bomb Wing, Langley Air Force Base, Va., before transatlantic flight to Sculthorpe, England, in July 1952.

All 33 RB-45Cs built were assigned to the 91st Strategic Reconnaissance Wing's 322nd, 323rd and 324th Strategic Reconnaissance Squadrons. The RB-45C also flew several long-range reconnaissance missions over the Soviet Union during the mid-1950s. On 29 July 1952, an RB-45C made the first non-stop trans-Pacific flight, having been refueled twice by KB-29s along the way. Maj. Lou Carrington and his crew of the 91st Reconnaissance Wing flew from Alaska to Japan in 9 hrs 50 mins, winning the MacKay Trophy for their achievement. Within the 91st SRW, by 1954 the RB-45C had been replaced by the RB-47E. The phased-out RB-45Cs then went to the 19th Tactical Reconnaissance Squadron, which operated them until they were withdrawn from operational use in the spring of 1958.

By the end of the 1950s, all B-45s had been removed from active service. However, a few continued to act as test aircraft into the early 1970s.

=== Operation Ju-jitsu ===
The only other nation to use the RB-45C was the United Kingdom, where it was operated by an ad hoc unit of crews largely drawn from Nos. 35 and 115 Squadrons RAF. Whilst the Department of Defense was prohibited by the President of the United States from overflying the Soviet Union at the time, US allies closer to the European theatre of war could. In the United Kingdom, whilst successive Labour governments had refused, the return of Winston Churchill and a Conservative administration to Downing Street in 1951 brought a more co-operative atmosphere to joint intelligence initiatives.

As a result, under Operation Ju-jitsu, in July 1951 four aircraft were leased to Britain from the 91st Strategic Reconnaissance Wing to form 'Special Duties Flight, Sculthorpe', commanded by Squadron Leader John Crampton. Stripped of USAF markings and then applied with RAF markings, the four aircraft were attached to a USAF squadron based at RAF Sculthorpe, Norfolk in eastern England. The aircraft were tasked with flying deep-level reconnaissance missions over the Soviet Union to gather electronic and photographic intelligence. The Special Duties Flight conducted missions during the period 1952–54.

On 17 April 1952, three aircraft were assigned to head for Kyiv from West Germany, scheduled to return to Sculthorpe ten hours later. Flying at 36,000 feet (11,000 m), Crampton's aircraft was tracked by ground radar and came under antiaircraft fire. Applying full power, he immediately turned and headed for Germany, none too soon, as Soviet night fighters had been dispatched to hunt down his aircraft.

Subsequent flights over Ukraine were carried out using English Electric Canberras under the codename Project Robin, operating at higher altitudes of around 54,000 ft (16,000 m). It was not until 1994 (under the "fifty-year rule" of the Public Records Act 1958) that the existence of the spy missions became public knowledge.

== Variants ==
=== XB-45 ===
The first flight of the XB-45 was on 24 February 1947, from Muroc Army Air Field. A total of 131 test flights were flown by the three prototype aircraft, one being destroyed early on, killing two pilots.

The USAF accepted one of the two surviving aircraft on 30 July 1948, the other on 31 August. One was damaged beyond repair in an accident. The last XB-45 was delivered to Wright-Patterson Air Force Base in 1949. It proved excessively difficult to maintain and was relegated to being used as a ground trainer.

- 3 aircraft (45-59479 – 45–59481)

=== B-45A ===
The B-45A differed from the XB-45 in having improved ejection seats and communications equipment, an E-4 automatic pilot and bombing navigation radar.

The first production B-45 flew in February 1948, and the Air Force took delivery of 22 B-45s in April 1948. Powered by J35 turbojets and not considered combat-ready, they were assigned to training duties and to conduct various test programs. The next batch were powered by the more powerful J47 turbojets. The first B-45As entered service in November 1948 with the 47th Bombardment Group, and the initial order of 96 was completed in March 1950.

The first B-45As were not equipped with bomb fire control systems or bombsights. They suffered from gyrocompass failures at high speeds, unhooked bomb shackles, engine fires, and inaccurate cockpit gauges. The AN/APQ-24 bombing and navigation radar on some B-45s was maintenance heavy, and malfunctions in the pressurization limited the altitude at which the aircraft could operate.

Fifty-five nuclear-capable B-45s arrived in the United Kingdom in 1952. These were modified with a 1,200 gal (4,542 L) fuel tank in the aft bomb bay. Despite technical problems, these were Tactical Air Command's first-line deterrent in Europe.

- 96 aircraft (47-001 – 47-097)

B-45A-1 47-001 – 47-022 (22 aircraft)
B-45A-5 47-023 – 47-096 (74 aircraft)
B-45A 47-097 (static test airframe)

=== B-45B ===
The B-45B was a proposed variant of the B-45A with improved radar and fire-control systems. None were built.

=== B-45C ===
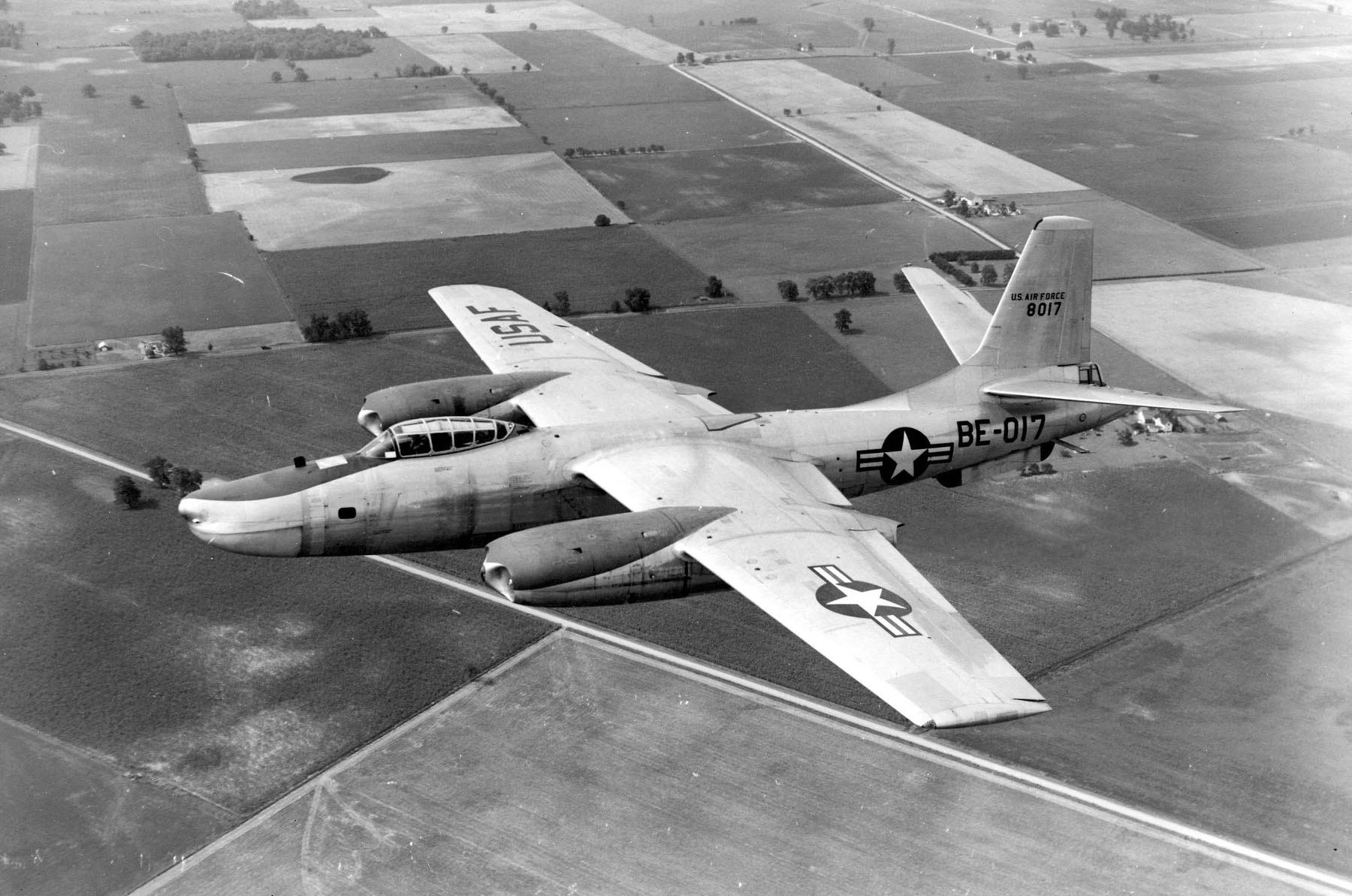
Development model of RB-45C 48-017 (This aircraft now resides at the Strategic Air Command & Aerospace Museum in Ashland, NE)

The B-45C was the first multiengine jet bomber in the world to be refueled in midair. It carried two 1,200 gal (4,542 L) wingtip fuel tanks, had a strengthened canopy, and an inflight refueling receptacle. The first B-45C was flown on 3 May 1949. Only ten were built, and the remaining 33 under construction were converted to RB-45Cs.

- Ten aircraft (48-001 – 48-010)

=== RB-45C ===
The RB-45C was the final production variant of the B-45. The bombardier's canopy was faired over and replaced with an oblique camera system. The RB-45C carried two 214 gal (810 L) external fuel tanks, or two JATO rockets. It could carry up to 12 cameras in four positions, or a single camera with a 100 in (2.5 m) focal length lens. The RB-45C first flew in April 1950, and was delivered from June 1950 to October 1951. Thirty-eight were built, including the 33 converted from B-45Cs. It was this variant that was operated (clandestinely) over the Soviet Union by the RAF "special duties" unit at RAF Sculthorpe, with the first sortie of three aircraft commanded by Squadron Leader John Crampton taking place on the night of 17 April 1952.

- 33 aircraft (48-011 – 48-043)

== Operators ==
United Kingdom

- Royal Air Force
  - No. 35 Squadron RAF crews grouped into ad hoc units operated RB-45C variant.
  - No. 115 Squadron RAF crews grouped into ad hoc units operated RB-45C variant.

USA

Tactical Air Command

- 47th Bombardment Group (later Wing), B-45A, 1949–1957

Langley AFB, Virginia 1949-1952
RAF Sculthorpe, England, 1952-1957

84th Bombardment Squadron
85th Bombardment Squadron
86th Bombardment Squadron, 1949, 1954–1957
422d Bombardment Squadron, 1953–1954

86th Bomb Squadron operated from RAF Alconbury, England, 1955–1959

- 19th Tactical Reconnaissance Squadron, RB-45C 1953–1957

Ninth Air Force (Attached to 363d Tactical Reconnaissance Wing)

Shaw AFB, South Carolina, 1953–1954

Third Air Force (Attached to 47th Bombardment Wing)

RAF Sculthorpe, England, 1954–1957

Strategic Air Command

- 91st Strategic Reconnaissance Group (Later Wing) B/RB-45C, 1950–1953

Barksdale AFB, Louisiana, 1950–1951
Lockbourne AFB, Ohio, 1951–1953

322d Strategic Reconnaissance Squadron
323d Strategic Reconnaissance Squadron
324th Strategic Reconnaissance Squadron

Note: Operated frequently from RAF Sculthorpe, England; Yokota AB and Johnson AB, Japan (1950–1952)

- 91st Strategic Reconnaissance Squadron, RB-45C, 1952–1954

Fifteenth Air Force (Attached to Far East Air Forces)

Yokota AB, Japan (Combat in Korean War)

Air Defense Command

- 4750th Tow Target Squadron

Yuma AFB, Arizona, 1954–1957

== Aircraft on display ==
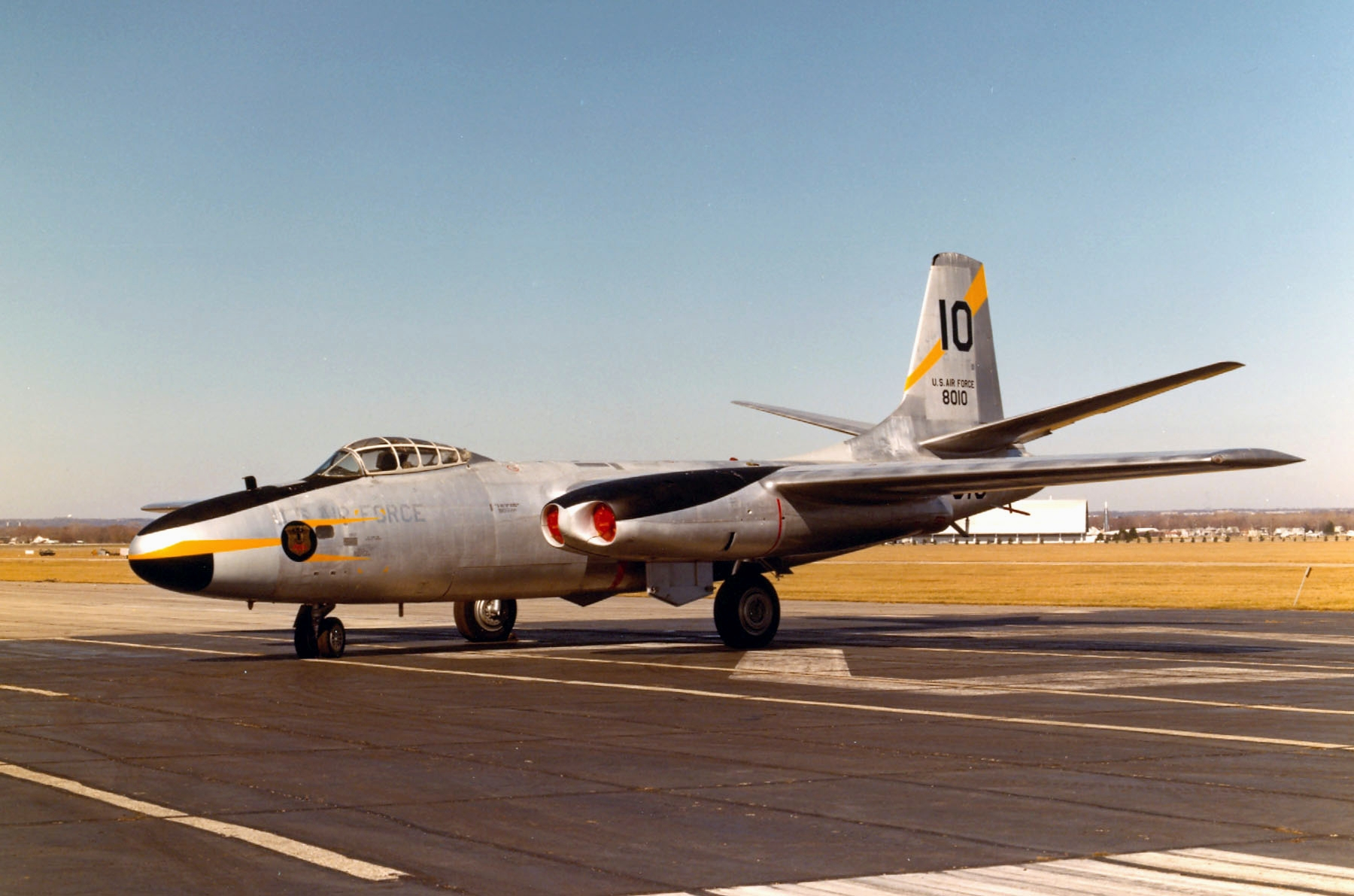
B-45C, AF Ser. No. 48-010, on display at the National Museum of the United States Air Force

Three B-45s have survived to the present day.

B-45A

- AF Ser. No. 47-0008 – Castle Air Museum at the former Castle AFB in Atwater, California.

B-45C

- AF Ser. No. 48-0010 – in the Korean War Gallery of the National Museum of the United States Air Force at Wright-Patterson AFB near Dayton, Ohio, The aircraft was used by Pratt & Whitney for engine testing, and was flown to the museum in 1971.

RB-45C

- AF Ser. No. 48-0017 – Strategic Air Command & Aerospace Museum in Ashland, Nebraska.

== Specifications (B-45A) ==

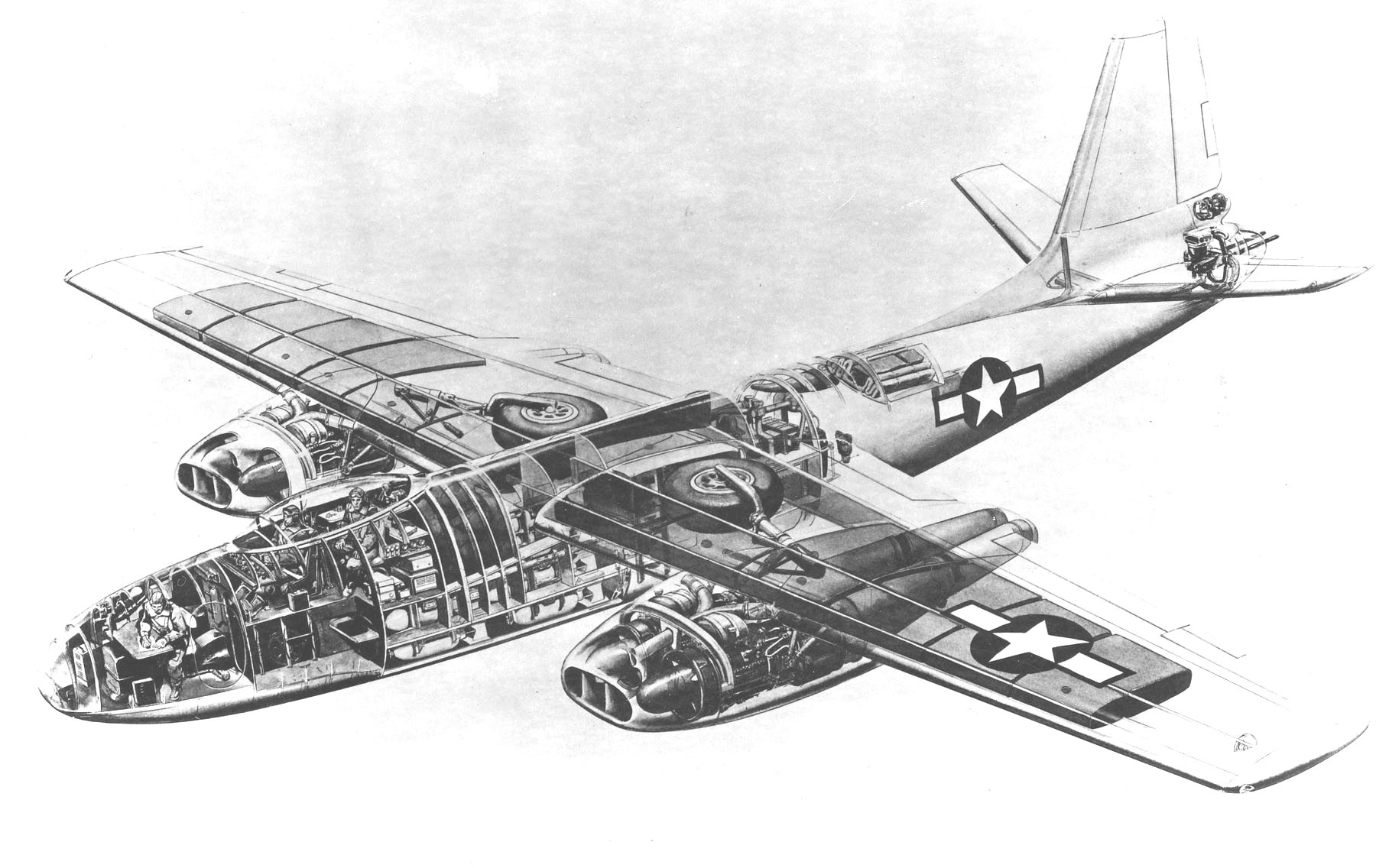
Cutaway view of XB-45. Note the intended radar-sighted tail gun position, later replaced by a conventional manned position.

Data from U.S. Standard Aircraft Characteristics

General characteristics

- Crew: 4 (Pilot, Co-Pilot, Bombardier-Navigator and Tail Gunner)
- Length: 75 ft 4 in (22.96 m)
- Wingspan: 89 ft 0 in (27.13 m)
- Height: 25 ft 2 in (7.67 m)
- Wing area: 1,175 sq ft (109.2 m^{2})
- Airfoil: root: NACA 66–215; tip: NACA 66–212
- Empty weight: 45,694 lb (20,726 kg)
- Gross weight: 81,418 lb (36,931 kg)
- Max takeoff weight: 91,775 lb (41,628 kg)
- Powerplant: 4 × General Electric J47-GE-13 turbojet engines, 5,200 lbf (23 kN) thrust each

Performance

- Maximum speed: 566 mph (911 km/h, 492 kn)
- Cruise speed: 365 mph (587 km/h, 317 kn)
- Range: 1,192 mi (1,918 km, 1,036 nmi)
- Ferry range: 2,170 mi (3,490 km, 1,890 nmi)
- Service ceiling: 46,000 ft (14,000 m)
- Rate of climb: 5,200 ft/min (26 m/s)
- Wing loading: 69.3 lb/sq ft (338 kg/m^{2})
- Thrust/weight: 0.26

Armament

- Guns: 2 × 0.50 in (13 mm) M3 machine guns (tail turret).
- Bombs: Up to 22,000 lb (10,000 kg)

== See also ==
Aircraft of comparable role, configuration, and era

- Boeing B-47 Stratojet
- Convair XB-46
- English Electric Canberra
- Martin XB-48
- Short Sperrin
- Douglas B-66 Destroyer/Douglas A3D Skywarrior
- Heinkel He 343
- Ilyushin Il-22
- Ilyushin Il-28

Related lists

- List of bomber aircraft
- List of military aircraft of the United States
