= Project Brass Ring =

Project Brass Ring was a 1950 United States Air Force project designed to deliver an early hydrogen bomb to within 2 miles (3.2 km) of a target using a drone version of the B-47 Stratojet, which would be guided by a mother ship and destroyed in the detonation. This project was given considerable support, due to uncertainty concerning the possible yield of a hydrogen bomb, then estimated to lie between 10 and 40 megatons. Brass Ring was meant to provide an interim nuclear weapons delivery capability while more capable (and less costly) systems were under development. The fear and concern surrounding the Soviet Union's development of its own nuclear weapons capability was the impetus to quickly begin the project. Project Brass Ring was similar in concept to the World War II Operation Aphrodite.

== See also ==
- Composite aircraft
- Mistel
