= Boeing XB-55 =

Strategic bomber project, U.S. Air Force, cancelled 1949

XB-55
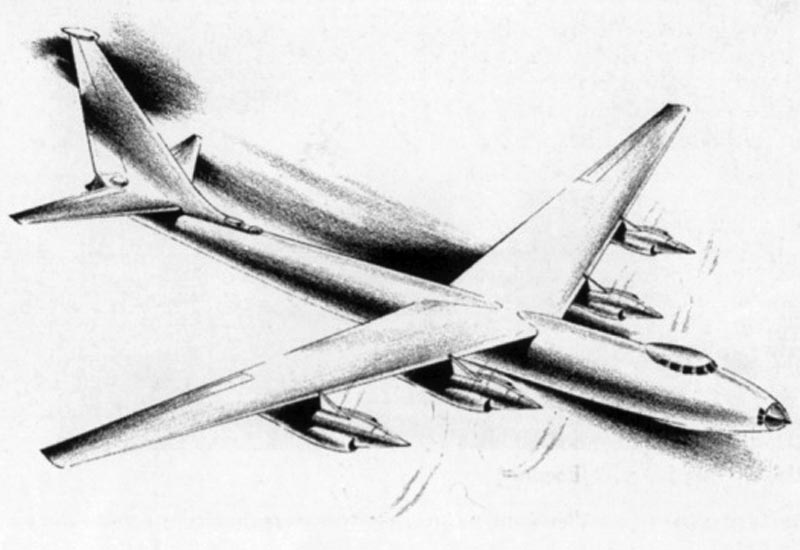
- Artist impression of the XB-55 bomber proposal

General information
- Type: Strategic bomber
- Manufacturer: Boeing
- Status: Canceled
- Primary user: United States Air Force
- Number built: 0

The Boeing XB-55 (company designation Model 474) was a proposed Boeing aircraft designed to be a strategic bomber. The XB-55 was intended to be a replacement for the Boeing B-47 Stratojet in United States Air Force (USAF) service.

== Design and development ==
The XB-55 concept was contained in a Request for Proposal (RFP) issued by the United States Air Force in October 1947, two months before the first flight of the XB-47 prototype. Several United States manufacturers responded to the RFP. Boeing was selected from among this group and given a contract on 1 July 1948 to conduct further engineering studies. Boeing's initial approach was to mount four turboprop engines on an airframe similar to its B-47: the wing would have less sweepback; the Allison T40-A-2 engines would drive three-blade contra-rotating propellers, i.e., six blades per engine; the engines were to be mounted in nacelles hung from the wings, two per side; the landing gear was to be similar to the B-47's tandem gear with outriggers retracting into the outboard engine nacelles. The XB-55 had a projected top speed of 490 mph (790 km/h) and a cruising speed of 435 mph (700 km/h), with a maximum weight of 153,000 lb (69,000 kg), a wingspan of 135 ft (41 m), and length of 118.9 ft (36.2 m).

There was a major disagreement between the engine manufacturer and the propeller manufacturer over whether the Allison T40-A-2 driveshaft was strong enough to take the forces caused at high revolutions per minute of the propellers. Allison was predicting that it would be at least four years before a successful powerplant would be delivered. In October 1948, a conference in Dayton, Ohio was addressing the problems of the XB-55 when it was proposed over lunch that the XB-52 (Boeing Model 464), which until that point had been planned with turboprop engines, could be equipped with the forthcoming Pratt & Whitney J57 turbojet engines. Within a week, it was clear that not only would the XB-52 outperform the XB-55, it could be flying at least a year before the XB-55 could be expected to have reliable engines. Also bearing on the decision to abandon the XB-55 program were government funding constraints and the growing realization that the B-47 was becoming more successful than first projected. On 29 January 1949, the Air Materiel Command was directed to cancel the Boeing XB-55 contract.

Under a revised contract, the Boeing Project 474 was converted into the Boeing Project 479, which included a study of using six J40 turbojet engines in place of the turboprops on a similar wing platform, but with a thicker root section. Work on detailed engineering and mockup construction was canceled, although Boeing was contracted to continue conceptual studies and wind tunnel investigations. These studies proved valuable in development of the Boeing B-52 Stratofortress, which first flew on 15 April 1952.

The XB-55 project did not result in construction of a prototype.

== Specifications (Estimated) ==
Data from Air Force Museum Fact Sheet

General characteristics

- Crew: ten
- Length: 118 ft 11 in (36.25 m)
- Wingspan: 135 ft 0 in (41.15 m)
- Height: 33 ft 8 in (10.26 m)
- Gross weight: 153,000 lb (69,400 kg)
- Max takeoff weight: 168,000 lb (76,204 kg)
- Powerplant: 4 × Allison T40A-2 coupled turboprop engines, 5,600 hp (4,200 kW) each

Performance

- Maximum speed: 426 kn (490 mph, 789 km/h)
- Cruise speed: 391 kn (450 mph, 724 km/h)
- Range: 4,350 nmi (5,010 mi, 8,060 km)
- Service ceiling: 42,000 ft (13,000 m)

Armament

- Guns: 10× 20 mm (.79 in) cannons
- Bombs: 24,000 lb (10,900 kg) bombs

== See also ==
Related development

- Boeing B-47 Stratojet
- Boeing XB-56

Aircraft of comparable role, configuration, and era

- Boeing B-52 Stratofortress
- Myasishchev M-4
- Tupolev Tu-95

Related lists

- List of bomber aircraft
- List of military aircraft of the United States
