= Boeing XB-56 =

Reconnaissance bomber proposal by Boeing

B-56

General information
- Type: Jet reconnaissance bomber
- National origin: United States
- Manufacturer: Boeing
- Status: Canceled
- Number built: None (not converted)

History
- Developed from: Boeing B-47 Stratojet

The Boeing XB-56 was a proposal by Boeing for a re-engined version of the American jet-powered medium bomber aircraft, the B-47 Stratojet. The original designation for this modification was YB-47C.

== Design and development ==
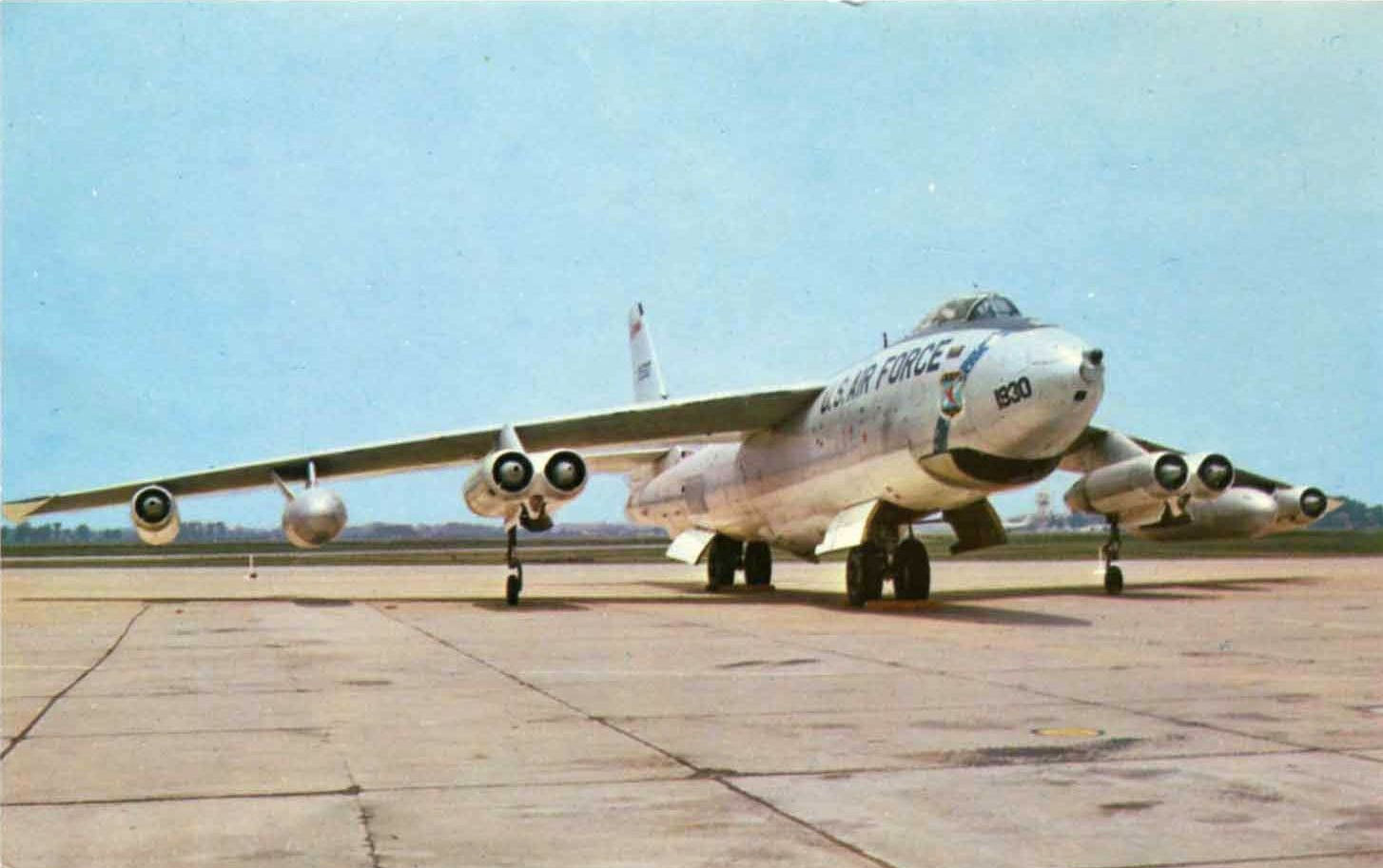
Picture of a B-47E. Clearly visible are the four engine nacelles with the six engines, which were to be replaced by four uniform nacelles and engines

The B-47 was equipped with six General Electric J47 turbojets, each rated at 5,200 pounds-force (23 kN) thrust. The engines were mounted in four nacelles slung from the high wing, with two engines in the inboard pod and one engine in the outboard nacelle. To reduce complexity and increase commonality, it was proposed that a higher-rated engine be selected such that one engine could be mounted in each nacelle.

The Allison J35 turbojet engine was being developed during the late 1940s, and it was provisionally rated at 8,500 lb_{f} (38 kN) or 9,700 lb_{f} (43 kN) with afterburner. Thus 4 × 8500 lb_{f} = 34,000 lb_{f} (150 kN) using that engine, as compared to 6 × 5,200 lb_{f} = 31,200 lb_{f} (139 kN) in the production B-47. Thus the conversion would be lighter, simpler and more powerful.

A contract was signed with Boeing in January 1950, calling for rework of one aircraft. A B-47B-20-BW (s/n 50-082) was earmarked for the conversion. The date for first flight was projected as April 1951.

A combination of delays and less-than-expected performance of the J35 led to the consideration of other engines. The Allison J71 was proposed, however problems with this engine meant that this was not feasible for the by-then redesignated B-56A. The Pratt & Whitney J57, eventually rated at 17,000 lb_{f} (76 kN) thrust, was also considered, but that engine was still in development, and the Boeing B-52 Stratofortress, which was being concurrently developed (first flight was April 1952), had priority for this engine.

The B-56 program was canceled in December 1952 before conversion of the prototype was started. The unconverted B-47 was relegated to a ground instructional airframe and in the late 1960s was in use at the Naval Air Facility El Centro as an egress trainer.

== Variants ==
XB-56
Designation for a single B-47 to be re-engined with four YJ71-A-5 engines, later re-designated YB-56 and YB-47C but was not converted.
RB-56A
Designation for production variant, cancelled and not built.

== Specifications (XB-56) ==
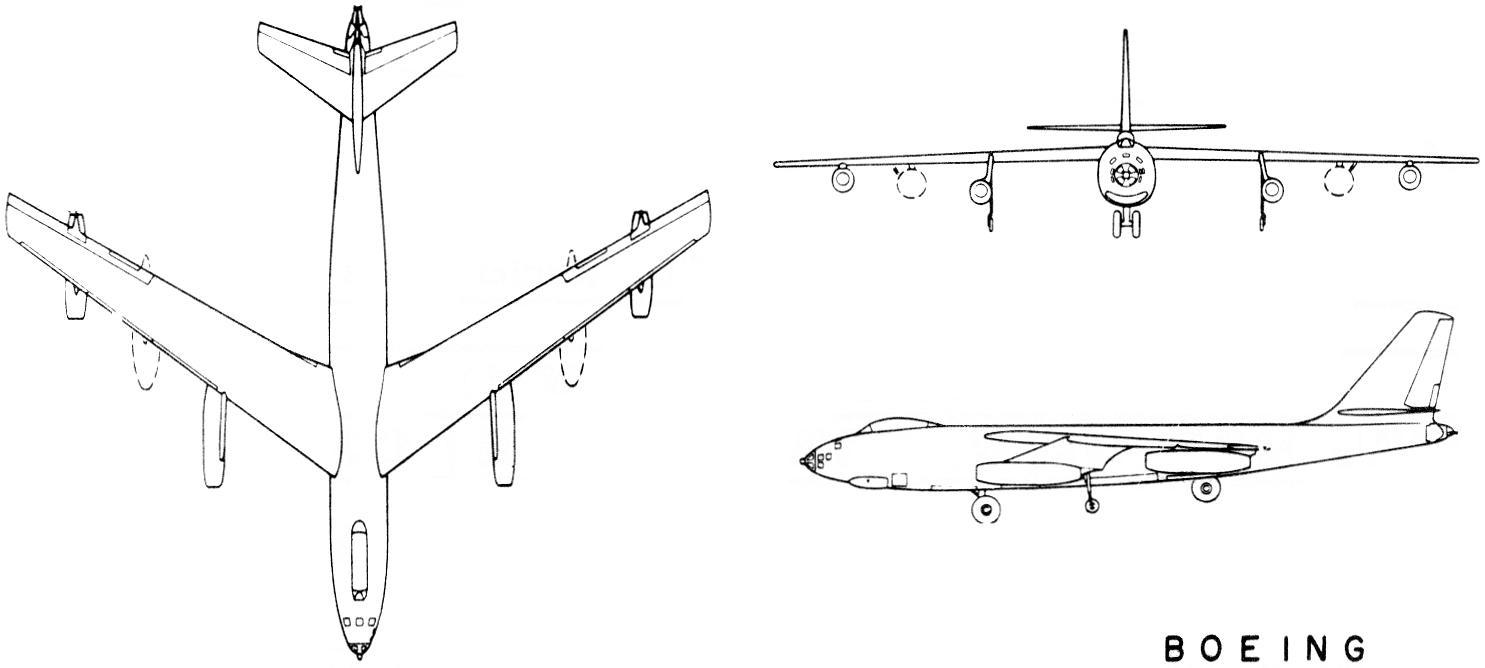
3-view line drawing of the Boeing B-56A Stratojet

General characteristics

- Crew: 3
- Length: 107 ft 1 in (32.64 m)
- Wingspan: 116 ft 0 in (35.36 m)
- Height: 28 ft 0 in (8.53 m)
- Wing area: 1,428 sq ft (132.7 m^{2})
- Powerplant: 4 × Allison YJ71-A-5 turbojet

== See also ==
Related development

- Boeing B-47 Stratojet
- Boeing XB-55

Related lists

- List of bomber aircraft
- List of military aircraft of the United States
