= 19th Reconnaissance Squadron (disambiguation) =

19th Reconnaissance Squadron may refer to:

- The 434th Bombardment Squadron, designated the 19th Reconnaissance Squadron (Light) from January 1941 to August 1941.
- The 909th Air Refueling Squadron, designated the 19th Reconnaissance Squadron (Heavy) from March 1942 to April 1942.
- The 19th Tactical Electronic Warfare Squadron, designated the 19th Reconnaissance Squadron, Long Range (Photographic) from June 1945 to December 1945 and the 19th Reconnaissance Squadron (Photographic) from November 1947 to June 1949.

== See also ==
- The 19th Tactical Reconnaissance Squadron
