= Larry Reithmaier =

American engineer and writer

- Born: May 28, 1921; Chicago, Illinois, United States
- Died: January 31, 2015 (aged 93)
- Occupations: Engineer and author
- Children: Barbara and Mark

Larry Reithmaier (May 28, 1921 – January 31, 2015) was an American engineer and author. His book, "Private Pilot's Guide" won the top award presented by the Aviation/Space Writers Association for excellence in writing on the subject of general aviation in 1974. Larry graduated from the University of Illinois in 1944 with a Bachelor of Science in Mechanical Engineering. During a long career as an aerospace engineer, Larry worked on the design and development of the F2H, F-3, F-86H, F-100, F-101, and F-4 fighter planes, the B-1B bomber, and Apollo and Skylab spacecraft. He also held various licenses for flying including commercial pilot rating, instrument rating, instructor rating and mechanic rating. Larry is included in the 1982 editions of Who's Who in California, Who's Who in the West, and Who's Who in Aviation and Aerospace. Beginning in 1985, Larry was listed in Who's Who in America.

== Selected publications ==
- Standard Aircraft Handbook for Mechanics and Technicians ISBN 0-07-134836-0
- Aviation Mechanics Certification Guide ISBN 0-932882-01-3
- Aircraft Mechanics Digest ISBN 0-932882-03-X
- Aircraft Mechanics Shop Manual ISBN 0-932882-00-5
- Aircraft Repair Manual ISBN 0-932882-02-1
- Aviation-Space Dictionary ISBN 0-8306-8092-6
- Computer Guide for Pilots ISBN 0-8168-7200-7
- Controlling Pilot Error: Maintenance & Mechanics ISBN 0-07-137319-5
- Flight Planning Guide for Pilots ISBN 0-8168-7204-X
- Mach 1 and Beyond: The Illustrated Guide to High-Speed Flight ISBN 0-07-052021-6
- Pilot's Handbook of Instrument Flying ISBN 0-8168-7305-4
- Pilot's Handbook of Weather ISBN 0-8168-7600-2
- Private Pilots Guide ISBN 0-8168-7600-2
- Radar Guide for Pilots ISBN 0-8168-7208-2
- Weather Briefing Guide for Pilots ISBN 0-8168-7212-0
