= B66 =

B66 may refer to:

- B66 (New York City bus) in Brooklyn
- Douglas B-66 Destroyer
- Sicilian, Richter-Rauzer, Encyclopaedia of Chess Openings code
