= McDonnell F3H Demon =

US Navy fighter aircraft

F3H Demon
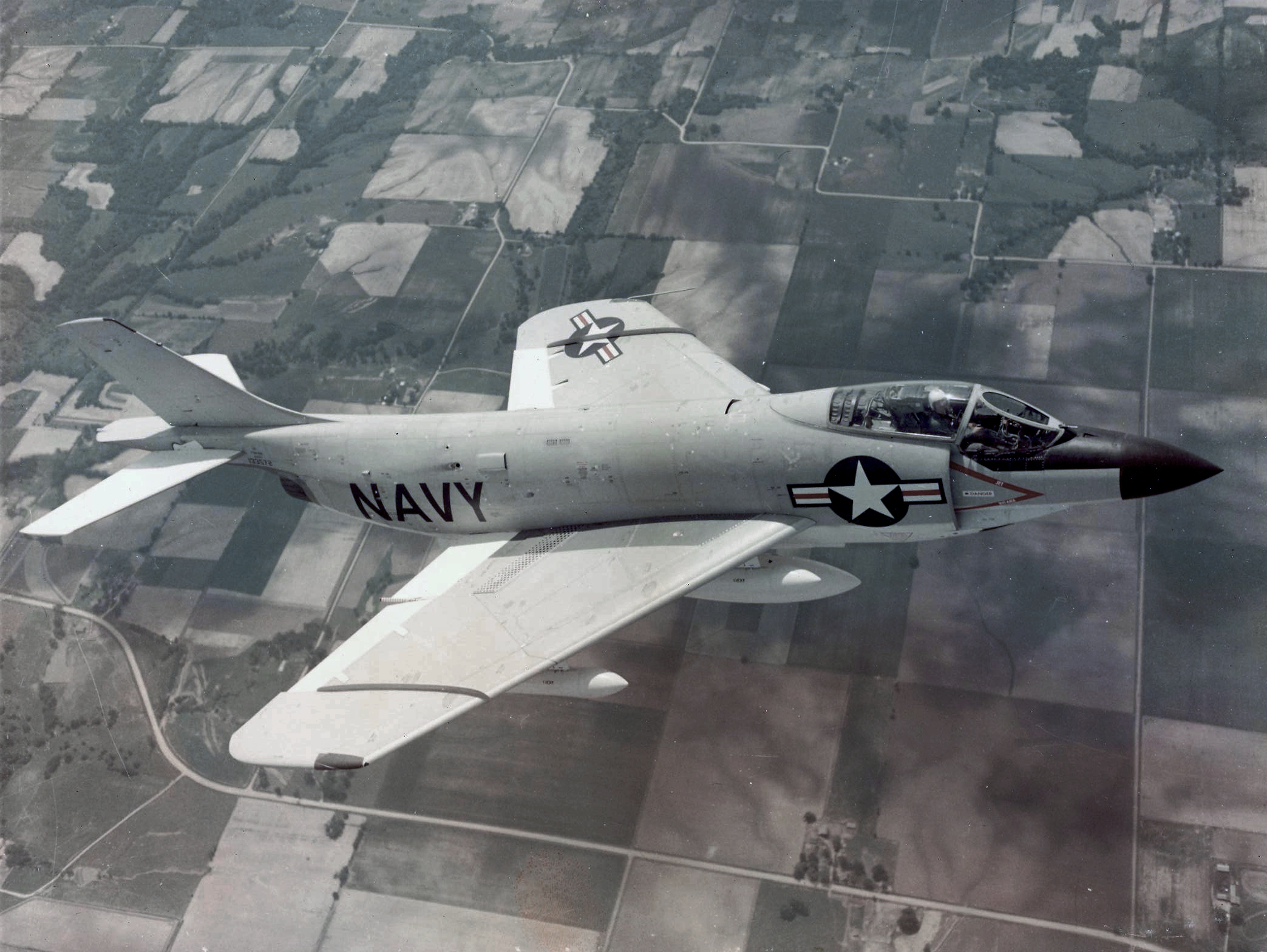
- An F3H-2N Demon in flight in 1956

General information
- Type: Carrier-based all-weather interceptor
- Manufacturer: McDonnell Aircraft Corporation
- Status: Retired
- Primary user: United States Navy
- Number built: 519

History
- Introduction date: 7 March 1956
- First flight: 7 August 1951
- Retired: 1964

The McDonnell F3H Demon is a subsonic swept-wing carrier-based jet fighter aircraft designed and produced by the American manufacturer McDonnell Aircraft Corporation. It was the first swept wing jet fighter and the only single-engined carrier-based fighter the company produced.

The Demon was developed during the late 1940s and early 1950s to fulfill a United States Navy requirement for a high-performance swept wing naval fighter to succeed the F2H Banshee. On 7 August 1951, the XF3H-1 performed its maiden flight, flown by test pilot Robert Edholm. The original design for a short-range interceptor was reworked into a heavier medium-range all-weather fighter to counter the Mikoyan-Gurevich MiG-15 jet fighter being encountered during the Korean War; however, the addition of about 7,000 lb (3,200 kg) of weight hampered the Demon's performance. The Demon was originally to be powered by the Westinghouse J40 turbojet engine, but the J40 proved unreliable and lacking in thrust, and the program was ultimately abandoned after it became politically controversial in 1955. This necessitated another major redesign of the aircraft to accept the alternative Allison J71 powerplant.

On 7 March 1956, the Demon was introduced to operational service. Though the aircraft had insufficient power for supersonic performance and insufficient endurance for its intended general-purpose role, it complemented day fighters such as the Vought F8U Crusader and Grumman F11F Tiger as an all-weather, missile-armed interceptor. The Demon was withdrawn in 1964 and thus did not participate in the Vietnam War. Both it and the Crusader were replaced on Forrestal-class and similar supercarriers by the more capable and versatile McDonnell Douglas F-4 Phantom II, which bears a strong family resemblance, as it was conceived as an advanced development of the Demon. The supersonic F-101 Voodoo of the United States Air Force was similar in layout, but was derived from the earlier XF-88 Voodoo, which also influenced the Demon's layout.

== Development ==
=== Background ===
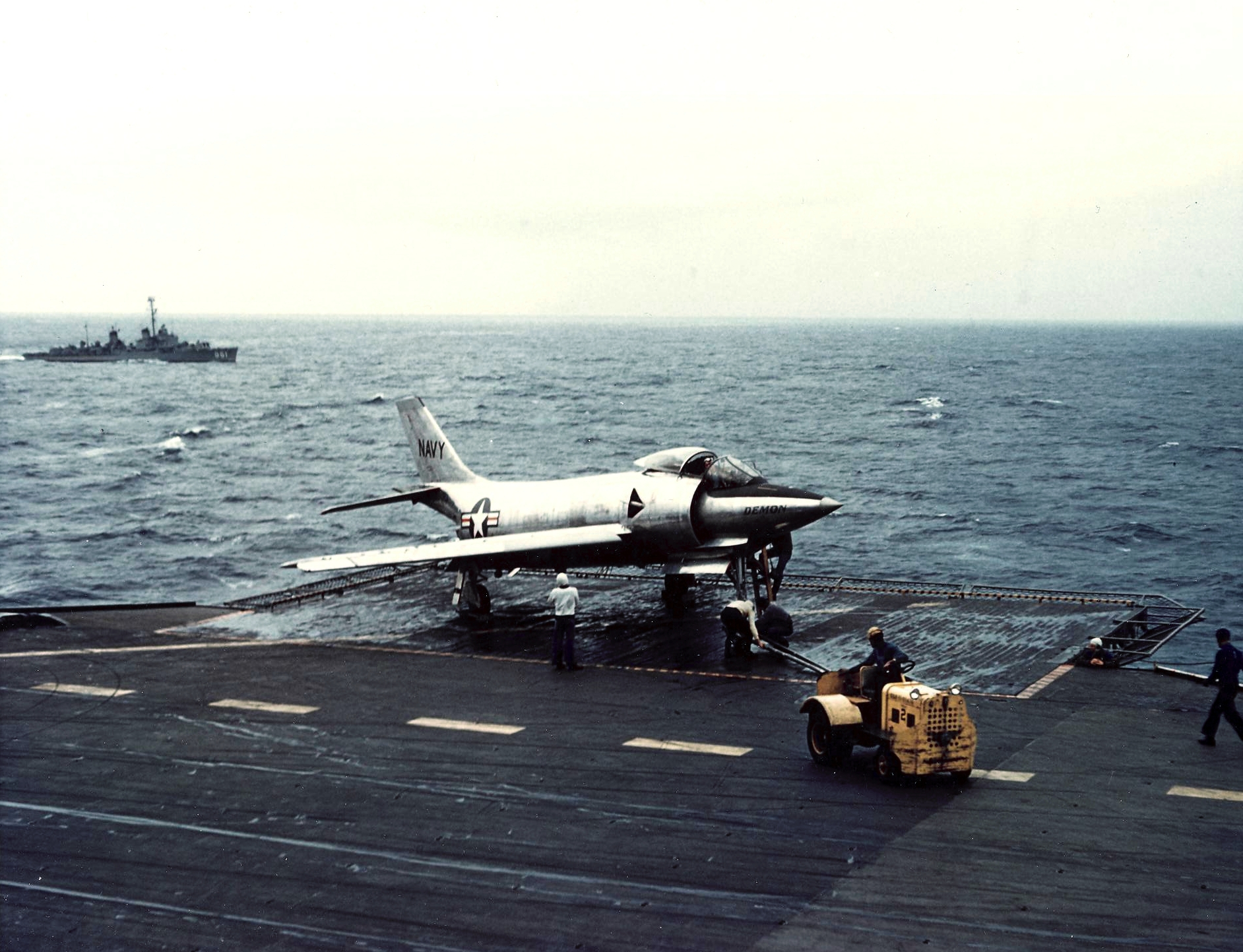
XF3H-1 prototype on USS Coral Sea in 1953

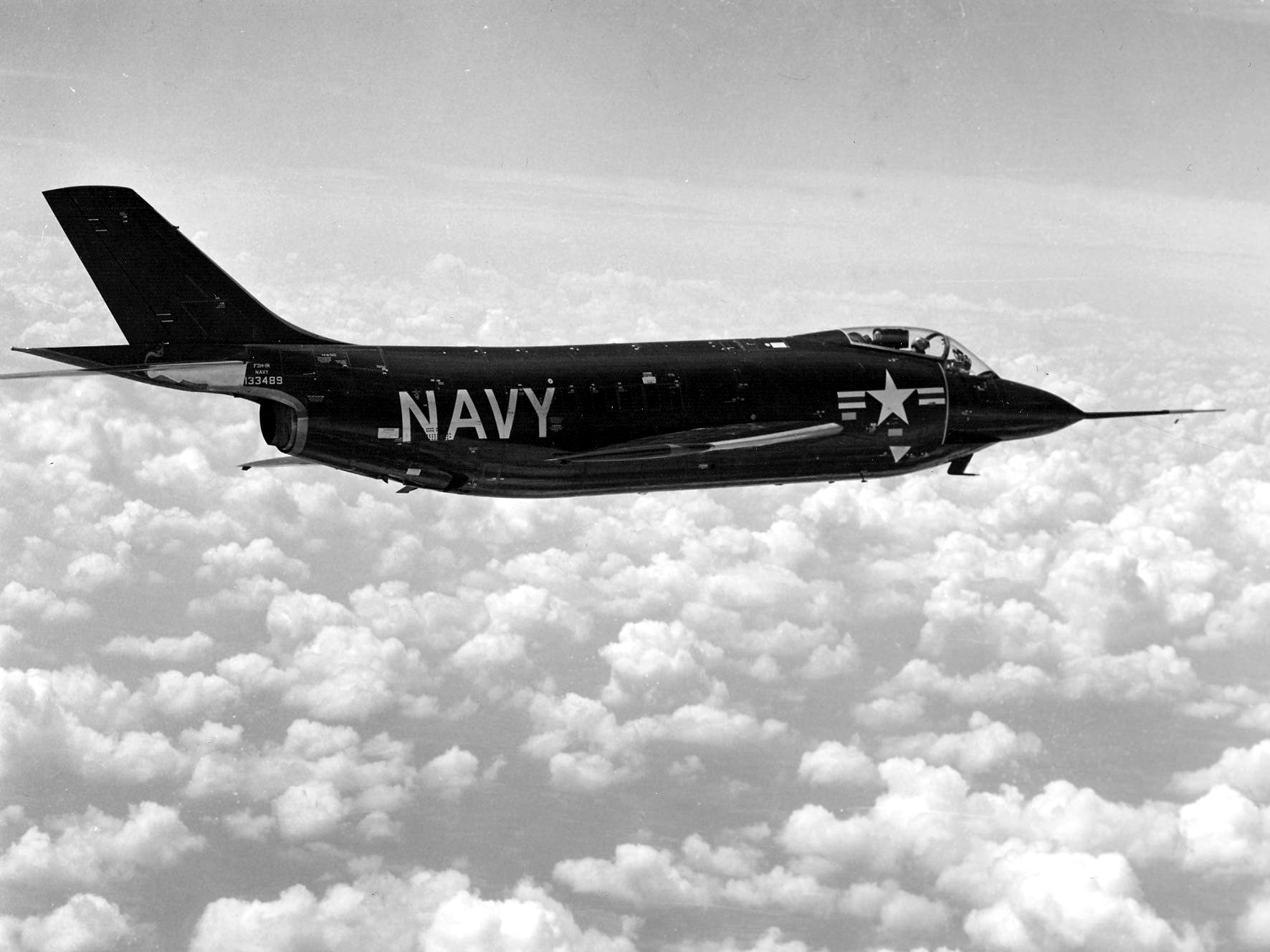
The first F3H-1N in 1954

Although the existence of the Soviet Union's Mikoyan-Gurevich MiG-15 jet fighter program was unknown to U.S. intelligence at the time, the United States Navy anticipated the appearance of high-performance Soviet jet fighters, and issued requirements for a high-performance swept wing naval fighter on 21 May 1948. McDonnell was one of six aircraft companies that opted to produce a response, beginning development work during 1949. The design team chose to develop an all-new aircraft incorporating a swept wing configuration from the onset rather than adapting a straight wing into a swept wing design as had been done with the competing Grumman F9F Cougar. Roll control was achieved via ailerons augmented by a compact spoiler. Furthermore, both the horizontal and vertical tail surfaces were also swept back. It was the company's first swept wing design, and was amongst the first American aircraft to be primarily armed with missiles rather than cannons.

The resulting aircraft, which later received the name Demon, emerged as an all-new design. In order to fulfil the U.S. Navy's requirements, McDonnell agreed to power the aircraft with the Westinghouse J40 engine which was then under development. At the time, the J40 was being promoted by Navy officials for its next generation of aircraft, and was to have thrust of over 11,000 lbf (49 kN)—three times that of the engines used on the McDonnell F2H Banshee. Having gained the interest of U.S. Navy officials, McDonnell was issued with a development contract to produce two XF3H-1 prototypes on 30 September 1949, albeit as a fallback measure to the unconventional Douglas F4D Skyray. At this stage of development, it was envisioned as a day fighter. McDonnell named the aircraft Demon shortly thereafter.

The unexpected combat debut of the MiG-15 during the Korean War motivated the U.S. Navy to place the Demon as a top priority, having observed the MiG to have considerably outclassed both the Panther and Banshee; the only American fighter then in service that could equal the MiG was the North American F-86 Sabre, which was only operated by the United States Air Force. Seeking to better respond to the MiG, the U.S. Navy pushed for the aircraft to be heavily redesigned, reorienting it from the short-range interceptor mission once envisioned towards a medium-range all-weather fighter; adapting the design necessitated the addition of 7,000 lbs of weight to an aircraft that originally weighed 22,000 lbs, thus negatively impacting its performance.

=== Initial flights and engine difficulties ===
During March 1951, the aircraft was hastily ordered into production for an initial batch of 150 F3H-1Ns. This order came prior to even reviewing the mockup, which occurred in July of that year. On 7 August 1951, the prototype performed its maiden flight at the hand of test pilot Robert Edholm. It quickly proved to be relatively easy to fly, fairly maneuverable, and the controls were responsive, yet it was also severely underpowered, particularly impacting high altitude flight. This prototype was lost during a test flight roughly four months later. The first test flights of the operational design did not occur until January 1953, by which time the conflict in Korea was drawing to a close.

The Demon had originally been designed around the ambitious Westinghouse J40 engine, which was to provide enough power to permit the use of just one engine in a number of new aircraft. However, this engine would ultimately fail to produce the promised thrust or to even run reliably; its performance was a major disappointment, producing only half of the expected power. It also suffered from a restricted flight envelope and frequent compressor stalls. The airframe's use of an uncommon annular air intake, which inherently results in relatively poor pressure recovery, may have also contributed to the performance difficulties.

James Smith McDonnell, president of McDonnell Aircraft Corporation, personally wrote to Washington, warning that the engine would be a "disappointingly underpowered combination" and requesting a substitute engine be permitted. Instead, the U.S. Navy opted to persist with the J40 engine in the hope that development of a more powerful version, the J40-10, would proceed rapidly; instead, Westinghouse proved unable to smoothly progress on the project and the issue became increasingly politically charged as time went on. Of the 35 F3H-1N aircraft flown with the J40 engine, eight were involved in major accidents. The first production Demons were grounded after the loss of six aircraft and four pilots. Time magazine called the Navy's grounding of all Westinghouse-powered F3H-1 Demons a "fiasco", with 21 unflyable planes that could be used only for Navy ground training at a loss of $200 million. One high point of the J40 was the 1955 setting of an unofficial time-to-climb record, in a Demon, of 10,000 feet (3,000 m) in 71 seconds. However, the J40 program was terminated sometime during 1955.

All of the aircraft that the J40 was to power were either canceled or redesigned to use other engines, notably the J57 and the J71. The F4D Skyray had been designed to accept larger engines in case the J40 did not work out, and was eventually powered by the Pratt & Whitney J57. But no other engine could simply be fitted into the old Demons, necessitating both the wings and fuselage to be redesigned and enlarged. The associated cost and delays were such that the U.S. Navy considered cancelling development of the Demon as well. The best alternative turned out to be the Allison J71 engine, which was also powered the Douglas B-66 Destroyer. Subsequent F3Hs with this powerplant were designated the F3H-2N. In service, the J71 proved problematic, providing insufficient power for an aircraft of the Demon's size, while also suffering from frequent flameouts and compressor stalls. During October 1954, the first J71-powered Demon was flown. Another significant problem was the reliability of the in-house developed ejection seat: initial versions were found to be unreliable and were eventually replaced with Martin-Baker ejection seats that were becoming the standard U.S. Navy seat of choice due to their higher performance at low altitude and better reliability.

=== Production ===
Despite the problems encountered, the U.S. Navy placed an order for 239 F3H-2s, the first of which being deployed during March 1956. 519 Demons were constructed before production was terminated during November 1959. It was not the U.S. Navy's first all-weather interceptor with radar (the AN/APG-51 air interception set was used first on the F2H-4 Banshee). The F3H-2 Demon had the AN/APG-51A, later upgraded to the 51-B version with a tunable magnetron then on to 51-C with better countermeasures in the receiver. It was a relatively straightforward radar arrangement in comparison to that of the Skyray. Furthermore, upgrading this radar proved to be somewhat easy as well.

The F3H-2N's standard armament was four 20 mm (.79 in) Colt Mk 12 cannons. In later years, the upper two cannons were often omitted to save weight. Later models, redesignated F3H-2M, were equipped to fire the Raytheon AAM-N-2 Sparrow and later the Sidewinder air-to-air missiles. Deployed aircraft carried both types of missiles, the Sparrow on the inboard rails and the Sidewinder outboard. Cannons were not used in carrier air defense applications, but they were installed and armed when situations (such as the Cuban Missile Crisis) dictated, and where the aircraft might be deployed against surface targets. Furthermore, up to 6,000 pounds of external stores, including fuel tanks, bombs and rocket pods, could be carried. The additional range provided by external fuel tanks was relatively small due to parasitic drag.

At a late stage of development, the nose had been tilted downwards by ten degrees to improve the pilot's forward and downward visibility. The windscreen was also changed multiple times with the same aim in mind. Due to the excellent visibility from the cockpit, the Demon earned the nickname "The Chair". Demon pilots were known colloquially as "Demon Drivers" while ground crews who worked on the aircraft were known as "Demon Doctors". The unfavorable power-to-weight ratio gave rise to the less flattering nickname "lead sled", sometimes shortened to "sled". Pilots observed its favourable flying characteristics and high level of stability when being flown at high altitude and during carrier operations, being relatively easy to land under almost any circumstance.

A reconnaissance version of the aircraft, the F3H-2P, was proposed, but ultimately never built. The Demon was flown as the U.S. Navy's front-line fighter up until 1962, at which point it was succeeded by the newer and faster F-4 Phantom II (which was a development of a proposed "Super Demon", a larger and much heavier version of the F3H). Developed during the Korean War to counter the MiG-15, it did not claim any aerial victories either with missiles or during dogfights, although it flew over Lebanon and Quemoy during 1958.

In 1962, the F3H was redesignated F-3. The F3H-2N became the F-3C, the F3H-2M became MF-3B, and the F3H-2 changed to F-3B. During September 1964, the final Demon-equipped squadron, VF-161 'Chargers', traded their F-3s for F-4 Phantom IIs.

== Variants ==
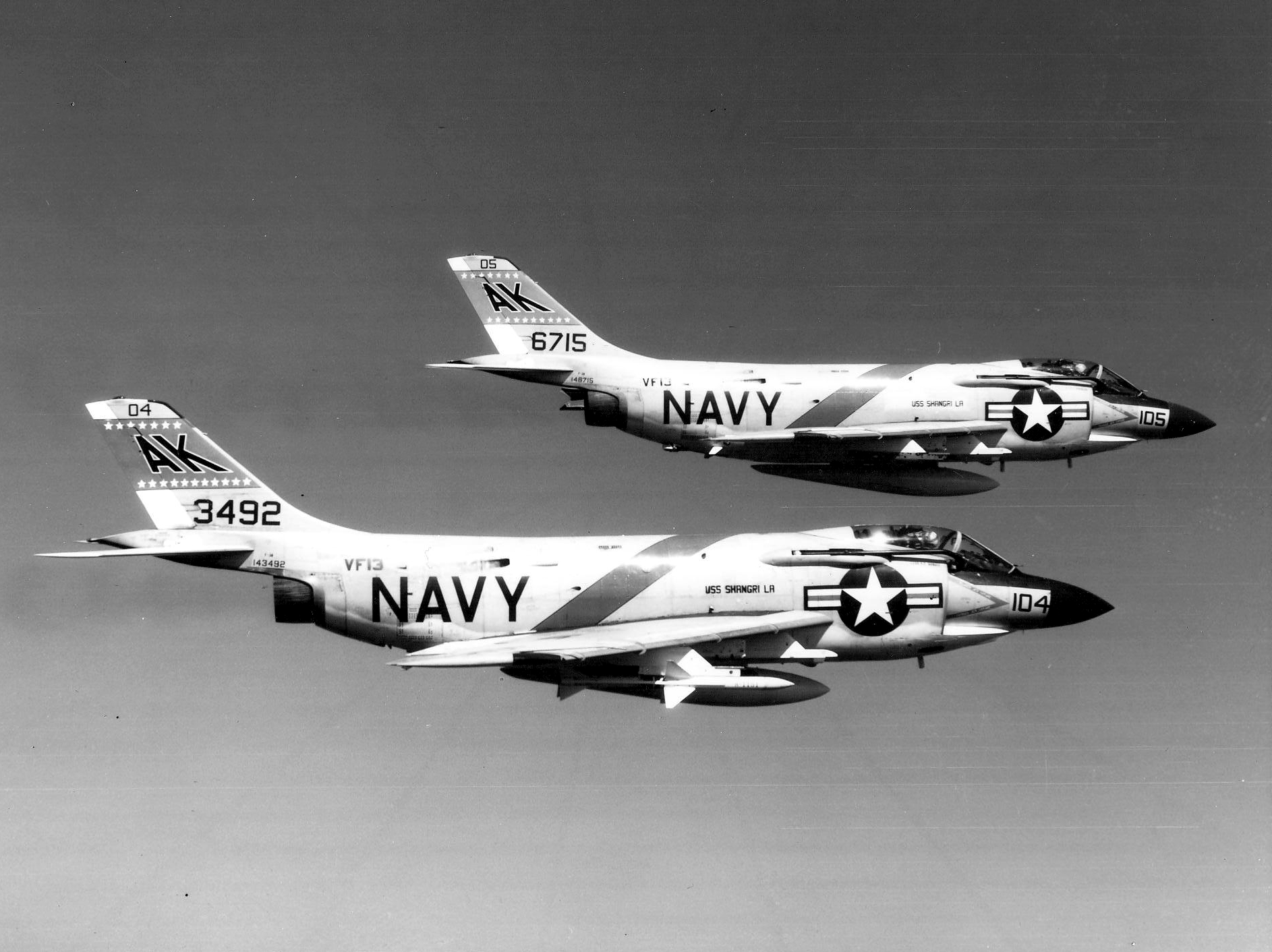
F-3Bs of VF-13 in 1963

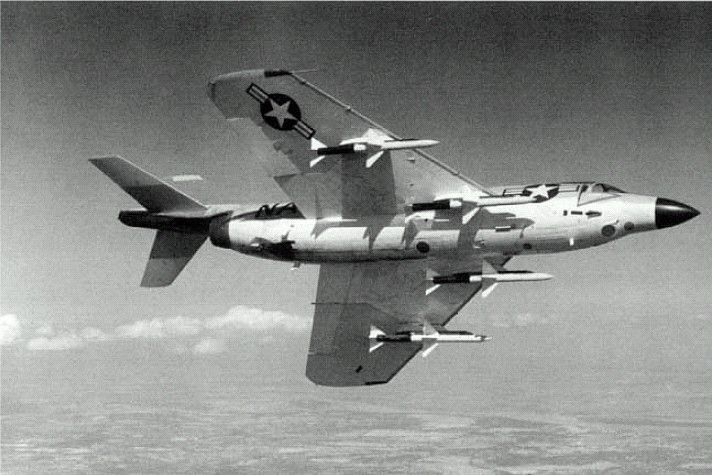
An F3H-2 with Sparrow missiles

XF3H-1
Company designation Model 58. Prototype single-seat clear-weather interceptor fighter. Powered by 6,500 lbf (29 kN) (9,200 lbf (41 kN) with afterburner) Westinghouse XJ40-WE-6 engine. Two built.
F3H-1N
Company designation Model 58Q. Initial production version. Single-seat all-weather fighter version, powered by 7,200 lbf (32 kN) (10,900 lbf (48 kN) with afterburner) J40-WE-22 engine. 58 built.
F3H-1P
Proposed reconnaissance version of F3H-1. Never built.
F3H-2N
Company designation Model 58W. All-weather fighter powered by 9,500 lbf (42 kN) (14,250 lbf (63.4 kN) Allison J71-A-2 engine and equipped to carry AIM-9 Sidewinder air-to-air missiles. 239 built. Redesignated F-3C in 1962.
F3H-2M
Company designation Model 58Y. Derivative of F3H-2N armed with four AIM-7 Sparrow air-to-air missiles. 80 built. Redesignated MF-3B in 1962.
F3H-2
Company designation Model 58AA. Single-seat strike fighter version, retaining Sidewinder and Sparrow capability of the −2M/N and adding payload of 6,000 lb (2,730 kg) bombs or rockets. 239 built. Redesignated F-3B in 1962.
F3H-2P
Company designation Model 58T. Proposed photo-reconnaissance version of −2. Unbuilt.
F3H-3
Proposed version with the General Electric J73 engine. Unbuilt.

== Operators ==
United States

- United States Navy

== Aircraft on display ==
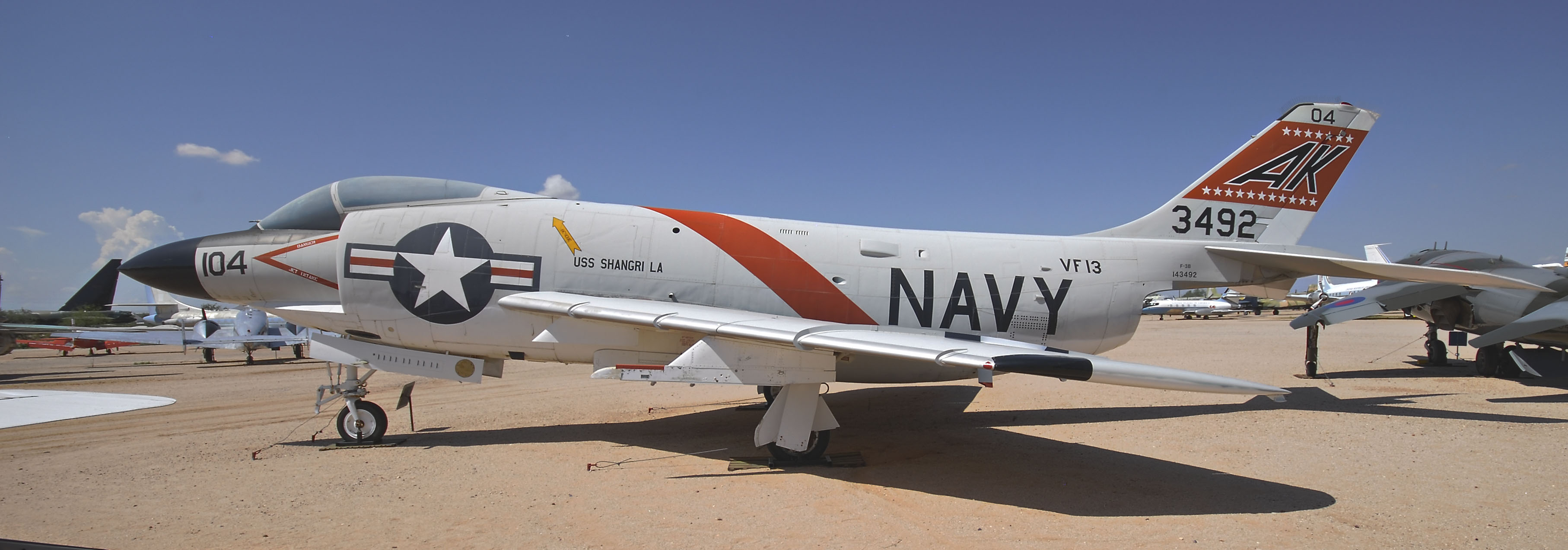
McDonnell F3H-2 Demon at the Pima Air Museum in 2015

F3H-2

- BuNo 145221 - Pima Air & Space Museum, adjacent to Davis-Monthan AFB in Tucson, Arizona.

F3H-2M

- BuNo 137078 - National Museum Naval Aviation at Naval Air Station Pensacola, Florida.

F3H-2N

- BuNo 133566 - USS Intrepid Museum in New York City, New York.

== Specifications (F3H-2) ==
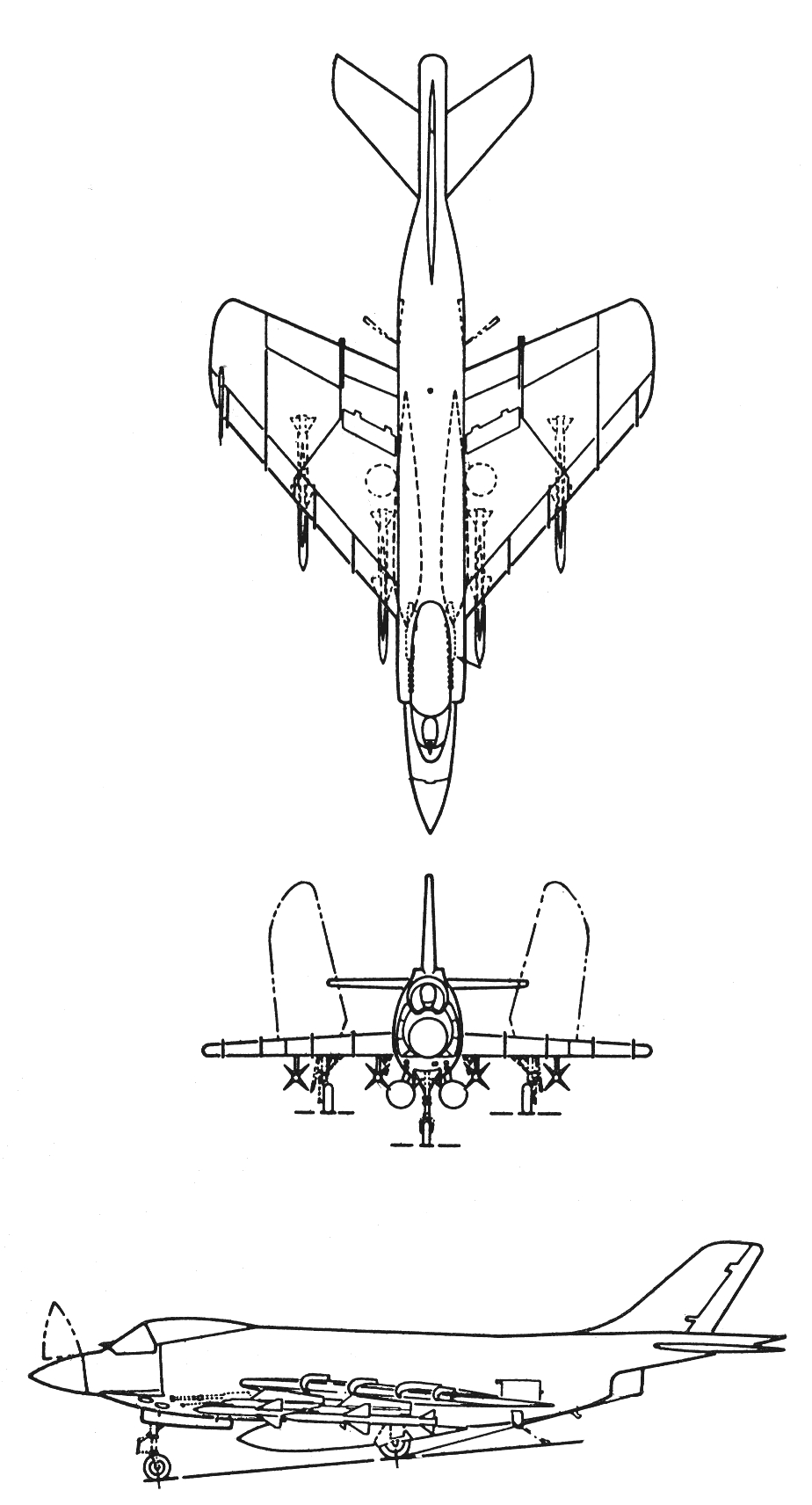
3-view drawing of a McDonnell F3H-2M Demon

Data from The American Fighter

General characteristics

- Crew: 1
- Length: 59 ft (18 m)
- Wingspan: 35 ft 4 in (10.77 m)
- Height: 14 ft 7 in (4.45 m)
- Wing area: 519 sq ft (48.2 m^{2})
- Empty weight: 21,133 lb (9,586 kg)
- Gross weight: 33,900 lb (15,377 kg)
- Powerplant: 1 × Allison J71-A-2E afterburning turbojet engine, 9,700 lbf (43 kN) thrust dry, 14,750 lbf (65.6 kN) with afterburner

Performance

- Maximum speed: 716 mph (1,152 km/h, 622 kn) at sea level

647 mph (562 kn; 1,041 km/h) at 30,000 ft (9,100 m)

- Range: 1,370 mi (2,200 km, 1,190 nmi)
- Endurance: Three hours at 575 mi (500 nmi; 925 km) radius
- Service ceiling: 35,050 ft (10,680 m)
- Rate of climb: 12,795 ft/min (65.00 m/s)

Armament

- Guns: 4x 20 mm (0.787 in) Colt Mk 12 cannon with 150 rpg
- Missiles: 4x AIM-7 Sparrow or 4x AIM-9 Sidewinder
- Bombs: 6,000 lb (2,700 kg) of external stores, including fuel tanks, bombs and rocket pods

Avionics

- AN/APG-51A, B, and C radar

== See also ==
Related development

- McDonnell Douglas F-4 Phantom II
- McDonnell F2H Banshee

Aircraft of comparable role, configuration, and era

- Dassault Étendard IV
- de Havilland Sea Vixen
- Douglas F4D Skyray
- Grumman F-9 Cougar
- Grumman F-11 Tiger
- North American FJ-4 Fury
- North American F-100 Super Sabre
- Supermarine Scimitar
- Vought F7U Cutlass

Related lists

- List of fighter aircraft
- List of military aircraft of the United States
- List of United States Navy aircraft designations (pre-1962)
