= Martin P6M SeaMaster =

US Navy strategic bomber flying boat

P6M SeaMaster
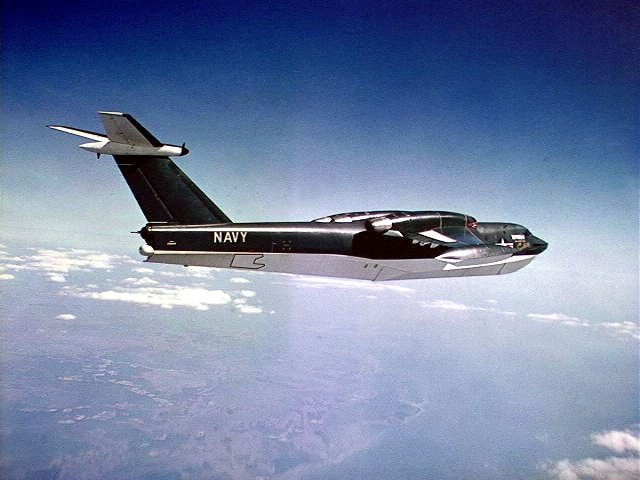

General information
- Type: Patrol flying boat
- Manufacturer: Glenn L. Martin Company
- Primary user: United States Navy
- Number built: 16

History
- First flight: 14 July 1955

The Martin P6M SeaMaster was an experimental strategic bomber flying boat built by the Glenn L. Martin Company for the United States Navy that almost entered service; production aircraft were built and Navy crews were undergoing operational training, with service entry expected in about six months, when the program was cancelled on 21 August 1959. Envisioned as a strategic nuclear weapon delivery system for the Navy, the SeaMaster was eclipsed by the Polaris submarine-launched ballistic missile (SLBM). Due to the political situation at the Pentagon and weapon system choices made amid budgetary constraints, the Navy promoted the P6M primarily as a high speed minelayer.

== Design and development ==
In the immediate postwar defense climate, the United States Air Force's Strategic Air Command was the linchpin of the United States' security as the sole means of delivery of the nation's nuclear arsenal. The Navy saw its strategic role being eclipsed by the Air Force and knew both its prestige and budgets were at stake.

Its first attempt to address this came in the form of the USS United States, a large supercarrier intended to launch Navy strategic bombers. This was cancelled in 1950 shortly after her keel was laid down, a victim of budget cuts and US Air Force interference. In response, the Navy chose to create a "Seaplane Striking Force", useful for both nuclear and conventional warfare, including reconnaissance and minelaying. Groups of these planes supported by seaplane tenders or special submarines could be located close to the enemy, and being mobile, they would be hard to neutralize.

The requirement issued in April 1951 was for a seaplane able to carry a 30,000 lb (14,000 kg) warload over a range of 1,500 mi (1,300 nmi; 2,400 km) from its aquatic base. The aircraft was to be capable of a low altitude dash at Mach 0.9 (1,100 km/h). Both Convair and Martin submitted proposals, and the Martin proposal was chosen as more promising. An order for two prototypes was issued which was projected to lead to six pre-production aircraft and a projected twenty-four production aircraft.

Originally the plane was to have a Curtiss-Wright turbo-ramjet engine, but this ran into problems and a more conventional Allison J71-A-4 turbojet was employed, fitted in pairs in overwing pods to keep the spray out of the intakes. Wings swept at 40° were used; they displayed a notable anhedral and were designed with tip tanks that doubled as floats on the water. Many features of Martin's XB-51 bomber prototype were used, including an all-moving T-tail and a rotating bomb bay—pneumatically sealed against seawater in the P6M.

== Operational history ==
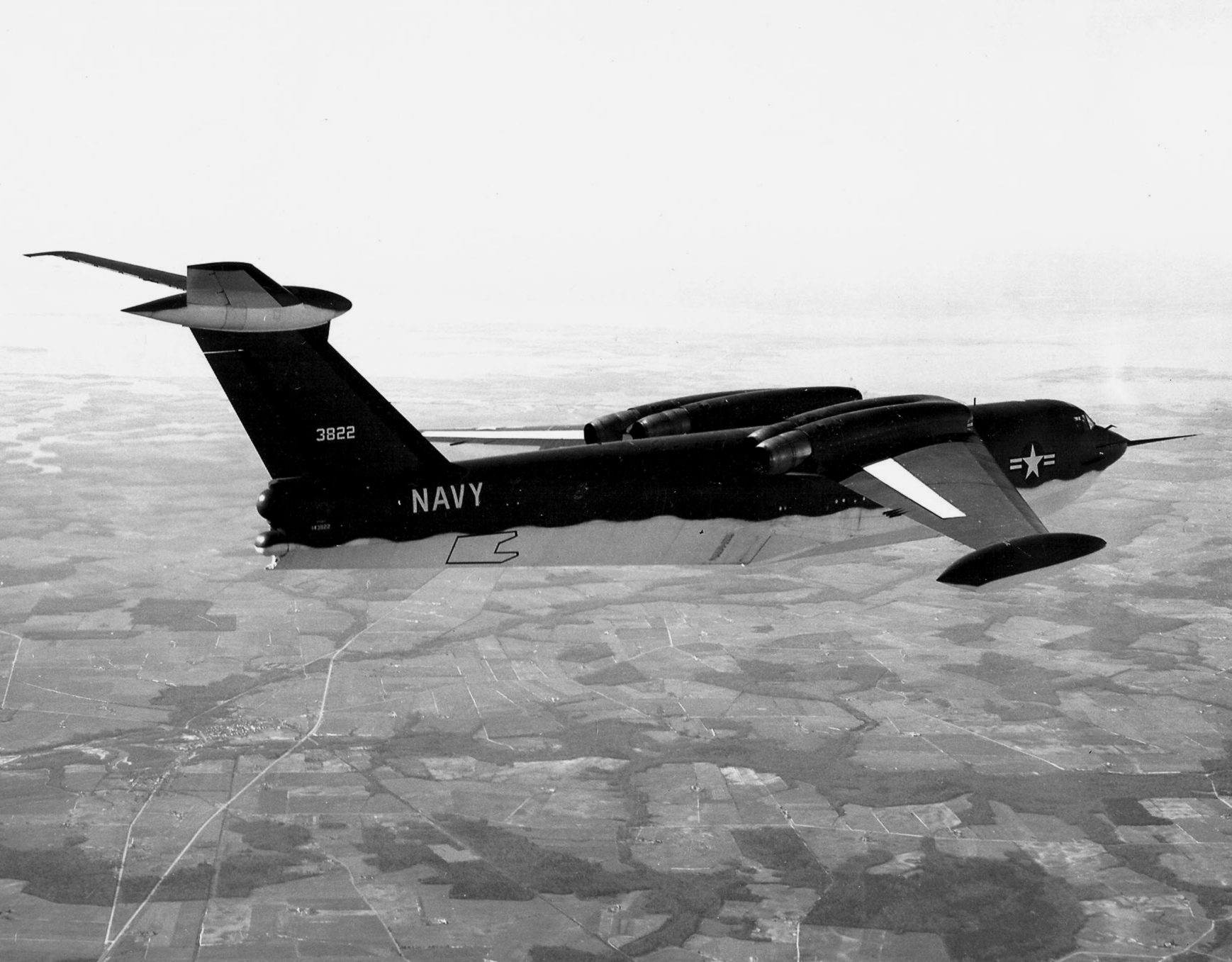
YP6M-1 in flight

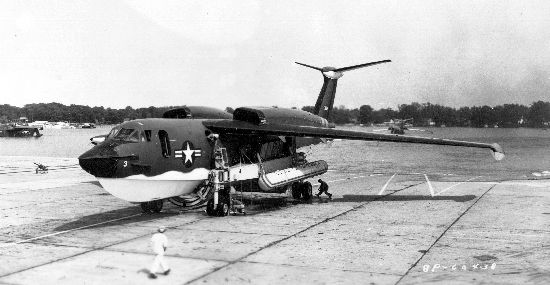
P6M-2 on beaching gear

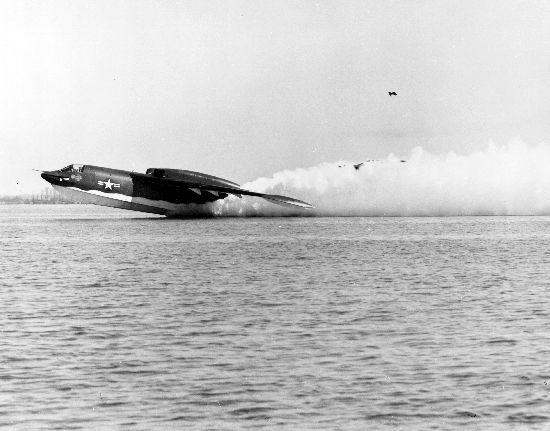
P6M-2 illustrating takeoff spray pattern

The first flight of the XP6M-1 came on 14 July 1955, but early tests showed that the engines were mounted too close to the fuselage and scorched it when afterburners were used, leading to angling the engines slightly outward in subsequent aircraft. Flight testing was initially successful, but, on 7 December 1955, a control system fault destroyed the first prototype with the loss of all aboard. The first prototype, BuNo 138821, c/n XP-1, disintegrated in flight at 5,000 feet (1,500 m) due to the horizontal tail going to full up due to a control malfunction, subjecting the airframe to 9 g stress as it began an outside loop, crashing into the Potomac River near the junction of St. Mary's River, killing four crew members.

Eleven months later, on 9 November 1956, the second prototype, BuNo 138822, c/n XP-2, first flown on 18 May 1956, was also destroyed, due to a change made in the horizontal stabilizer control system without adequate evaluation before test flying the design. The crash occurred at 15:36 near Odessa, Delaware due to a faulty elevator jack. As the seaplane nosed up at ~21,000 feet (6,400 m) and failed to respond to control inputs, the crew of four ejected. The airframe broke up after falling to 6,000 feet (1,800 m) before impact.

The first pre-production YP6M-1 was completed about a year later, with testing resuming in January 1958.

Five more were built in 1958 when the Navy announced that Harvey Point Defense Testing Activity in Hertford, North Carolina, would serve as the testing grounds for the fleet of Martin P6M SeaMasters. These aircraft were fitted with test versions of the full combat equipment suite and were used for bombing, mine laying and reconnaissance evaluations. The J71 engines were unreliable and the aircraft had spray ingestion problems at higher gross weights, which limited takeoffs to ideal conditions. The P6M-1 also had a serious control deficiency due to porpoising under some trim settings. These deficiencies resulted in the P6M-1 program being cut as it was no longer considered possible for it to be successfully developed.

The Navy and Martin felt that a new version, the P6M-2, would provide a useful aircraft. The first was rolled out in early 1959. Changes included new, more powerful Pratt & Whitney J75 engines, an aerial refueling probe, improved avionics, and a canopy with better visibility. A buddy refueling drogue kit had also been developed to fit in the bomb bay. Three had been built by summer 1959 and Navy crews were moving them through operational conversion when the program was abruptly canceled in August of that year.

The P6M-2 was an impressive aircraft; its Mach 0.9 (1,100 km/h) performance "on the deck" could be equaled by few aircraft of the time. The aircraft were heavily built, with the skin at the wing roots over 1 in (25 mm) thick. The normally docile and pleasant handling characteristics of the P6M-1 were replaced by some severe compressibility effects above Mach 0.8. These included rapid changes in directional trim, severe buffeting, and wing drop requiring high control inputs to counter. Until those problems were fixed, the P6M-2 could not be considered for use by the fleet.

Martin tried unsuccessfully to market the technology in the civilian market, with a version called the SeaMistress but there were no takers, and the company soon abandoned the aircraft business entirely to focus on missiles and electronics. The P6M was the final aircraft built by the Glenn L. Martin Company.

== Variants ==
XP6M-1
prototypes, two built (BuNos 138821, 138822). Both crashed.
YP6M-1
pre-production model, six built (BuNos 143822-143827). All six examples were scrapped when the program was cancelled.
P6M-2
production model, eight built (BuNos 145876-145899). 145877-145879 were completed and flown, 145876 and 145880-145883 were completed but not flown. Contracts for 145884-145899 were cancelled.

== Specifications (P6M-2) ==
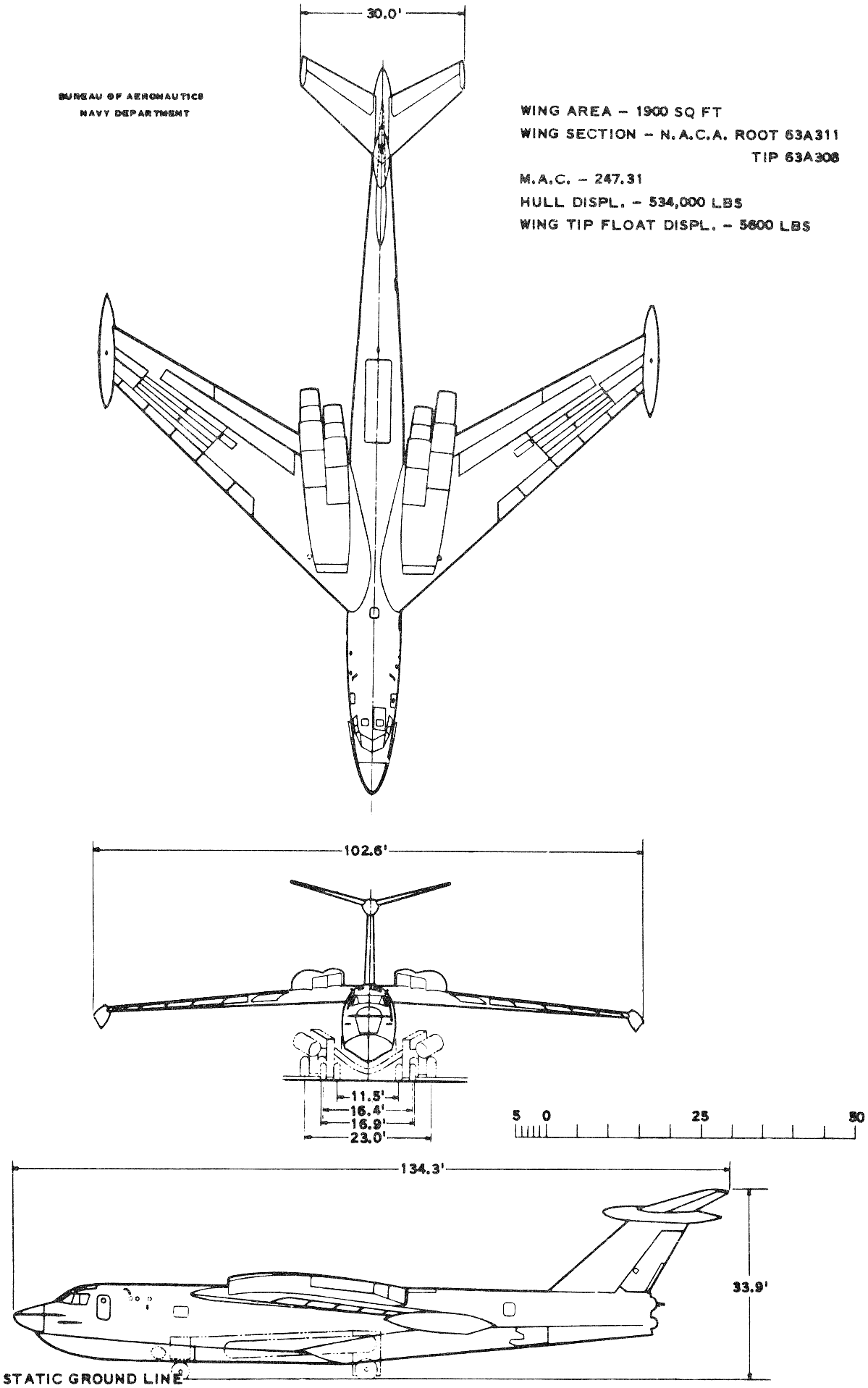
3-view line drawing of the Martin YP6M-1 Seamaster

Data from

General characteristics

- Crew: 4
- Length: 134 ft 4 in (40.94 m)
- Wingspan: 102 ft 7 in (31.27 m)
- Height: 33 ft 10 in (10.31 m)
- Wing area: 1,900 sq ft (180 m^{2})
- Empty weight: 97,439 lb (44,198 kg)
- Gross weight: 184,280 lb (83,588 kg) (at take-off)

162,392 lb (73,660 kg) (in combat)

- Max takeoff weight: 190,000 lb (86,183 kg) in calm water

160,000 lb (72,575 kg) in rough water (6 to 9 ft (1.8 to 2.7 m) swell)

- Powerplant: 4 × Pratt & Whitney J75-P-2 turbojet engines, 17,500 lbf (78 kN) thrust each

Performance

- Maximum speed: 686 mph (1,104 km/h, 596 kn) at 20,000 ft (6,096 m)
- Maximum speed: Mach 0.894
- Cruise speed: 535 mph (861 km/h, 465 kn)
- Stall speed: 152 mph (245 km/h, 132 kn) (Power off, flaps down, T.O. wt)
- Range: 2,083 mi (3,352 km, 1,810 nmi)
- Combat range: 750 mi (1,210 km, 650 nmi) (Carrying 30,000 lb (14,000 kg) payload)

1,726 mi (1,500 nmi; 2,778 km) with one AAR from a P6M-2 tanker

- Service ceiling: 50,000 ft (15,000 m)
- Rate of climb: 7,380 ft/min (37.5 m/s)
- Wing loading: 100 lb/sq ft (490 kg/m^{2})
- Thrust/weight: 0.368

Armament

- Guns: 2 × 20 mm cannon in rear remote operated turret (1,000 RDS/20mm)
- Mines: 28 x MK36 Mod 1 (1,001 lb/ea, 454 kg/ea) - 28,028 lb/Tot (12,713 kg)
- Mines: 15 x MK25 Mod 2 (2,030 lb/ea, 921 kg/ea) - 30,450 lb/Tot (13,812 kg)
- Mines: 36 x MK50 Mod 0 (504 lb/ea, 228 kg/ea) - 18,144 lb/Tot (8,230 kg)
- Mines: 15 x MK52 Mod 0,1,2,3,4,5,6 (1,348 lb/ea, 611 kg/ea) - 20,220 lb/Tot (9,172 kg)
- Mines: 8 x MK39 Mod 0 (2,025 lb/ea, 919 kg/ea) - 16,200 lb/Tot (7,348 kg)
- Mines: 15 x MK19 Mod 2 (540 lb/ea, 245 kg/ea) - 8,100 lb/Tot (3,674 kg)
- Mines: 5 x MK10 Mod 9 (1,960 lb/ea, 889 kg/ea) - 9,800 lb/Tot (4,445 kg)
- Reconnaissance: High Altitude Reconnaissance Camera 4,050 lb/Tot (1,837 kg)
- Reconnaissance: 27 x M120(T9E8) Photoflash (154 lb/ea, 70 kg/ea) 4,158 pounds (1,886 kg)
- Bomb: 2 x MK91 (3,500 lb/ea, 1,588 kg/ea) - 7,000 lb/Tot (3,175 kg)
- Bomb: 1 x MK28 (1,800 lb/ea, 817 kg/ea) - 1,800 lb/Tot (817 kg)

Avionics

- Fire-Control System: Aero X-23B AGL Tail Turret, ASQ-29 Automatic Navigation & Minelaying System

== See also ==
- Stanley Aviation ejection seats

Aircraft of comparable role, configuration, and era

- Beriev Be-10
- Martin P5M Marlin
- Shin Meiwa US-1A

Related lists

- List of flying boats and floatplanes
- List of United States Navy aircraft designations (pre-1962)
- List of military aircraft of the United States
