= Chambley-Bussières Air Base =

Airport in Grand Est, France

Chambley-Bussières Air Base Chambley-Bussières (LF-52) Aéroport Militaire
- Part of United States Air Forces in Europe (USAFE); French Air Force
- Located near: Chambley-Bussières, Meurthe-et-Moselle, France
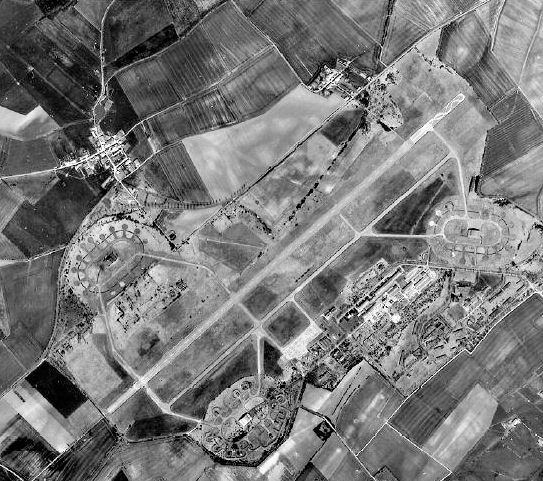
- Chambley-Bussières – 2003

Location
- Location of Chambley-Bussières AB, France
- Coordinates: 49°01′24″N 005°52′37″E

Site history
- Built: 1952
- In use: 1954–Present

Airfield information
- IATA: none; ICAO: LFJY

Summary
- Elevation AMSL: 864 ft (263 m)
- Website: https://www.chamblayplanetair.com
- Interactive map of Airfield information

Runways
Direction	Length		Surface
Direction	ft	m	Surface
05R/23L	6,900	2,100	Concrete
05L/23R	2,165	660	Asphalt
05C/23C	2,525	770	Turf

Chambley-Bussières Air Base is a former United States Air Force base in France. It is located in the Meurthe-et-Moselle département of France, about 20 km (12 mi) west of the French city of Metz, and about 2 km (1.2 mi) southwest of Chambley-Bussières, on the south side of the Départementale 901 (D901) (Meurthe-et-Moselle) road. The airport, now known as Chambley Planet'Air Aerodrome, is active as a civil airport.

The first use of Chambley-Bussières as an airfield was in 1940, when the French Air Force stationed 9 Potez 631 fighters and 5 Mureaux 117 observation aircraft on farmland. The aircraft were assigned to the GAO 2/506. After the Battle of France ended in May 1940, Chambley-Bussières was abandoned as an air base and returned to agricultural use. During the Cold War, Chambley-Bussières was a front-line base for the United States Air Forces in Europe (USAFE).

== United States Air Force use ==
In 1951, as a result of the Cold War threat of the Soviet Union, Chambley-Bussières was provided for use by the United States Air Force. Construction of the base on former farmland started in 1952, although construction delays prevented the facility from being ready for wing operations until mid-1955.

On 30 January 1953, during the initial construction period, the 73rd Air Depot Wing at Châteauroux Air Depot sent a small team to establish Flight A, 73rd Support Group Depot, Chambley. This flight was sent to receive, store and issue USAF supplies as needed by Air Force personnel and French contractors. This team lived near the main train station in Metz on the local economy and ensured at least one USAF airman was always present on the new base to provide site security.

The design of the airfield was to space parked aircraft as far apart as possible by the construction of a circular marguerite system of hardstands that could be revetted later with earth for added protection. Typically, the marguerite consisted of fifteen to eighteen hardstands around a large central hangar. Each hardstand held one or two aircraft, and allowed the planes to be spaced approximately 50 m (160 ft) apart. Each squadron was assigned to a separate hangar/hardstand complex. This construction can be seen clearly in the satellite image link at the bottom of this article.

Enough construction was completed by February 1954 that USAFE established the 7002d Air Base Squadron at Chambley to coordinate the set-up of various facilities, such as security, supply, transportation and communications.

Chambley Air Base was formally dedicated and turned over to the USAF on 12 June 1956.

=== 21st Fighter-Bomber Wing ===
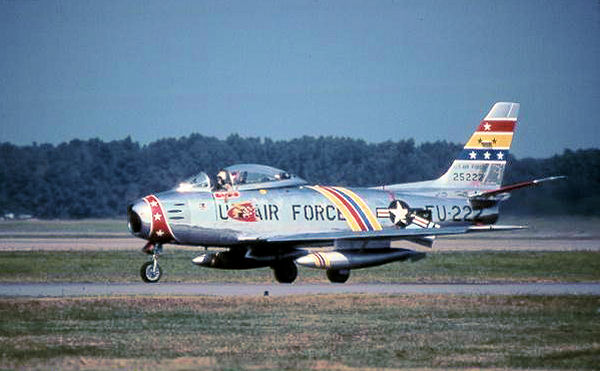
North American F-86F-35-NA Sabre Serial 52-5222 of the 72d Fighter-Bomber Squadron. The aircraft has been restored and is painted in the Wing Commander's motif, with blue, yellow and red striping.

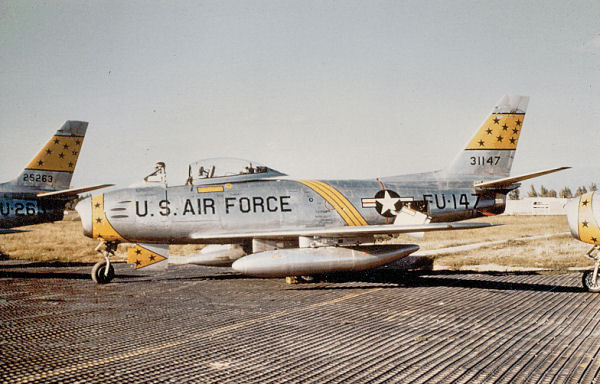
North American F-86F-35-NA Sabre Serial 53-1147 of the 21st FBW. Note the aircraft is parked on temporary steel planking, when the parking apron of Chambley was still unfinished.

The first USAF unit to use Chambley AB was the 21st Fighter-Bomber Wing, being transferred from George AFB, California. The wing's deployment to France had to be carried out in stages. Four echelons of wing personnel variously traveled by train, ship, and air to reach Chambley between November 1954 and January 1955. The 21 FBW officially established its headquarters at Chambley on 12 December 1954. The 21 FBW consisted of three squadrons, the 72d, 416th and 531st Fighter-Bomber Squadrons, equipped with the F-86F Sabre. In 1957, the Cabinet of France decreed that all nuclear weapons and delivery aircraft had to be removed from French soil by July 1958. As a result, the F-86's of the 21st Fighter-Bomber Wing had to be removed from France. During October 1957, it was announced that the 21 FBW would be inactivated on 8 February 1958, and that its assets would be dispersed among existing USAFE units.

After three years without any permanent flying units, in 1961, Chambley Air Base was reactivated as part of Operation Stair Step, the United States response to the Berlin Crisis of 1961. On 1 October 1961, as a result of the crisis, the mobilized Indiana Air National Guard 122d Tactical Fighter Wing was deployed to Chambley from Baer Field, Fort Wayne, Indiana. When activated, the 122d consisted of three tactical fighter squadrons, the 112th at Toledo Express Airport, Ohio; the 113th at Hulman Field, Terre Haute, and the 163d at Baer Field. The deployed wing was designated the 7122d Tactical Wing while in France. By 1 December, the ground support units arrived and the 7122d prepared for an estimated overseas deployment of 10 months.

On 7 June, the 163d was directed to return to CONUS with all personnel, however, the aircraft and equipment were to remain at Chambley.

The assets of the ANG 163rd TFS at Chambley were assigned to the 390th Tactical Fighter Squadron.

With the departure of the 390th TFS/366 TFW, Chambley-Bussières AB was again placed in reserve status, being used for various USAFE exercises over the next two years. The facility was turned over to the 7367th Combat Support Group which acted as the host USAF unit.

=== 25th Tactical Reconnaissance Wing ===
The 25th Tactical Reconnaissance Wing was activated on 1 July 1965 at Chambley AB, and absorbed the 19th Tactical Reconnaissance Squadron and 42d Electronic Countermeasures Squadron. On 1 May 1966, the 42d was inactivated and the squadrons remaining aircraft were deployed to Takhli RTAFB, with all of its assets in Thailand being assigned to the 41st Tactical Electronic Warfare Squadron (TEWS). The remaining aircraft of the 25 TRW were assigned to the 363d Tactical Reconnaissance Wing, Shaw AFB, South Carolina. On 15 October 1966, the 25 TRW was inactivated. The 7367th Combat Support Group was activated to close the facility.

On 1 April 1967, the last USAF personnel left Chambley AB, and the base was returned to French control.

== Current uses ==
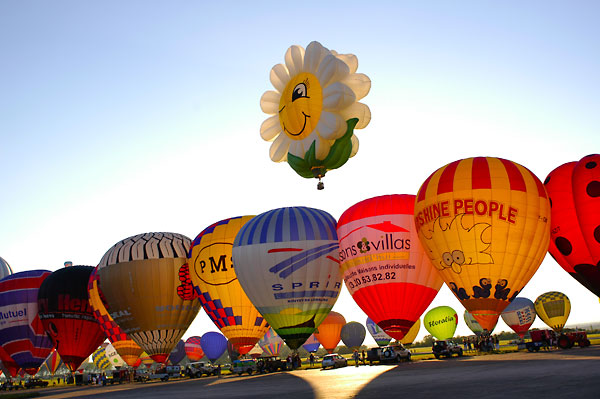
"Mondial Air Ballons" festival 2007

After the USAF's departure in 1967, the French Air Force (Armée de l'Air) assumed control of Chambley AB. It was used for various flight operations and also by airborne forces for many years.

Today, Chambley is being developed into a commercial business park. The runway and various taxiways are intact and usable. Many of the old USAF buildings and hangars are used for various non-military purposes.

The airfield is still classified as being a military airfield, however many aeronautical activities take place in particular by the means of a club of ultralight aircraft since over 20 years and the "Lorraine Mondial Air Ballons - GEMAB", which was Europe's largest hot air balloon festival and took place here every two years at the end of July until the final edition in 2023.

Since 2025 a new hot air balloon festival started. The first edition of the Enenvol – Chambley International Balloon Fiesta, held from July 25 to August 3, 2025, was a spectacular celebration of hot air ballooning that captivated thousands of visitors and pilots from around the world. Including Mass Ascents & Special Flights: Over 19 scheduled flights, including magical dawn patrols, night glows, night flights and a friendly competition in the form of a key grab and another task competition

Since 16 July 2009, the main runway (05/23) of the airfield is now open to civil air traffic restricted to very light aircraft with code LFJY.
