= 19th Tactical Electronic Warfare Squadron =

19th Electronic Warfare Squadron

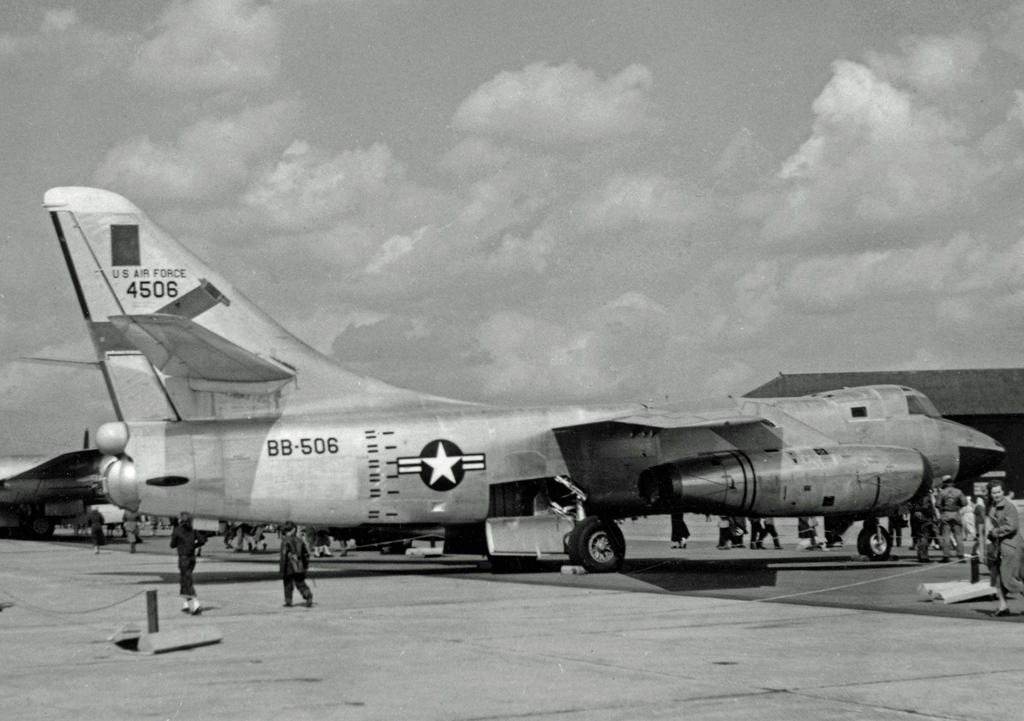
- Squadron RB-66 Destroyer in 1957 (Note: Aircraft is Douglas RB-66B-DL Destroyer, serial 54-506, at the RAF Burtonwood depot.)
- Active: 1942–1945; 1947–1949; 1953–1970; 2021–present
- Country: United States
- Branch: United States Air Force
- Role: electronic warfare
- Part of: United States Air Forces in Europe
- Engagements: European Theater of Operations
- Decorations: Air Force Outstanding Unit Award

Insignia
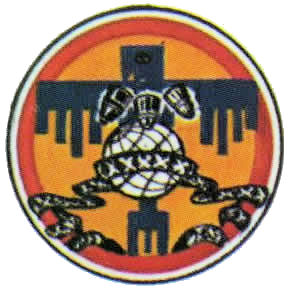
- 19th Tactical Reconnaissance Squadron emblem (Note: Over and through a yellow orange disc, border equally divided of white and red bands, a stylized thunderbird dark blue, surmounted by a trimetrogon camera proper, over a white globe marked with black lines of latitude and longitude; continuous film strip negative proper entwining red band of border on either side, and passing over face of globe in scroll form. Approved 23 November 1943.)

The 19th Electronic Warfare Squadron is an active United States Air Force unit, stationed in Bann, Germany as part of the United States Air Forces in Europe Warrior Preparation Center. It was first activated during World War II as the 19th Photographic Mapping Squadron. During the war, the squadron remained in the United States and mapped areas of North America. However, starting in 1944, the air echelon of the squadron deployed to North Africa to map that area. After V-E Day, the squadron moved to England and mapped large areas of Europe until October 1945, when it began to stand down for inactivation. It was briefly active in the reserve from 1947 to 1949 as the 19th Reconnaissance Squadron.

Redesignated the 19th Tactical Reconnaissance Squadron, the squadron reactivated in July 1953, moving to Europe the following year. In Europe, it trained and flew night photographic reconnaissance for NATO until 1966, when it returned to the United States to perform reconnaissance training. Its mission changed to electronic warfare training as the 19th Tactical Electronic Warfare Squadron in October 1967 and it was inactivated at Shaw Air Force Base, South Carolina in October 1970. The squadron was reactivated in its current role in May 2021.

== Mission ==
The squadron specializes in training United States service members and NATO partners to support transient fourth and fifth generation electronic warfare aircraft. It became a separate squadron to increase manning, resources and further their combat readiness.

== History ==
=== World War II ===
The 19th Photographic Mapping Squadron was activated at Peterson Field on 14 July 1942, as part of the 4th Photographic Group. It was equipped with Lockheed F-4 Lightnings. the group trained for overseas duty.

Reassigned to the 1st Photographic Group, the squadron transferred to Bradley Field, Connecticut. It deployed to Mexico to perform photographic mapping over Central and South America with long range Boeing F-9 Flying Fortress and Consolidated F-7 Liberator aircraft. It also performed photographic mapping of the United States while assigned to the 11th Photographic Group.

Reassigned to the 311th Reconnaissance Wing, the squadron moved overseas, being attached to the Royal Air Force. It was first deployed to Africa, the squadron photographed airfields and created maps of western and central Africa in support of Air Transport Command, developing logistical supply routes across the dark continent. It was later assigned to Egypt, mapping the Middle East with long-range aircraft including some Consolidated OA-10 Catalinas, photographing airfields, coastal defenses and ports.

Reassigned to England in April 1945, the squadron took bomb-damage assessment photographs of airfields, marshalling yards, bridges and other targets. It remained in the theater after combat ended, performing photo-mapping of Western Europe. It was inactivated at Foggia Airfield, Italy in December 1945.

=== Reserve service ===
The squadron was activated as the 19th Reconnaissance Squadron in the reserve under Air Defense Command (ADC) at Newark Airport, New Jersey, and assigned to the 66th Tactical Reconnaissance Group in November 1947. It trained under the supervision of the 114th AAF Base Unit (Reserve Training) (later the 2231 Air Force Reserve Flying Training Center). It is not clear whether or not the squadron was fully staffed or equipped with tactical aircraft. In 1948 Continental Air Command assumed responsibility for managing reserve and Air National Guard units from ADC. President Truman’s reduced 1949 defense budget required reductions in the number of units in the Air Force, and the 19th was inactivated and not replaced as reserve flying operations at Newark ceased.

=== Cold War ===
The 19th was reactivated at Shaw Air Force Base, South Carolina in July 1953 as the 19th Tactical Reconnaissance Squadron, assigned to the 363d Tactical Reconnaissance Wing, part of the Ninth Air Force. It was equipped with North American RB-45 Tornados. It trained in the United States until it was deployed to RAF Sculthorpe, England in May 1954. It was assigned to United States Air Force in Europe's Third Air Force and attached to the 47th Bombardment Wing. It performed tactical reconnaissance and photo-mapping missions over Western Europe and North Africa. It also conducted classified deep penetration and reconnaissance flights over the Soviet Union.

The squadron upgraded to Douglas RB-66 Destroyers and replaced the obsolescent RB-45s from February 1957. It became the primary night photographic reconnaissance squadron of the USAFE, being assigned to bases in West Germany, England and France. It returned to the United States after the French withdrawal from the NATO military alliance in 1966 and became a replacement training unit for RB-66 aircrews.

In 1968, the squadron was re-equipped with EB-66B electronic countermeasures aircraft. The reconnaissance equipment was removed and replaced by electronic jamming equipment. The tail turret was also removed, automatic jamming equipment was fitted in its place. Numerous antennae protruded from the aircraft, and chaff dispensing pods were carried. Redesignated the 19th Tactical Electronic Warfare Squadron and deployed to Pacific Air Forces), it was assigned to the 18th Tactical Fighter Wing first in Japan, later in Okinawa. The unit flew missions over North Vietnam as electronic warfare aircraft, joining strike missions to jam enemy radar installations.

The squadron was inactivated in 1970 at Kadena Air Base, Okinawa as part of the draw-down of USAF forces in Southeast Asia.

=== NATO training ===
The squadron's most recent activation came in May 2021, when it replaced United States Air Forces in Europe - Air Forces Africa Warfare Center Detachment 3 at Bann, Germany. The detachment had been established in 2019. The unit operates systems supporting Polygone, a multinational electronic warfare range on the German-French border. The squadron mission includes military exercise participation with partner countries.

== Lineage ==
- Constituted as the 19th Photographic Mapping Squadron on 14 July 1942

Activated on 23 July 1942
Redesignated 19th Photographic Squadron (Heavy) on 6 February 1943
Redesignated 19th Photographic Charting Squadron on 11 August 1943
Redesignated 19th Reconnaissance Squadron (Long Range, Photographic) on 15 June 1945
Inactivated on 15 December 1945

- Redesignated 19th Reconnaissance Squadron (Photographic) on 8 October 1947

Activated in the reserve on 6 November 1947
Inactivated on 27 June 1949

- Redesignated 19th Tactical Reconnaissance Squadron (Night Photographic) on 21 April 1953

Activated on 20 July 1953

- Redesignated 19th Tactical Electronic Warfare Squadron on 15 October 1967

Inactivated on 31 October 1970

- Redesignated 19th Electronic Warfare Squadron on 6 April 2021

Activated on 11 May 2021

=== Assignments ===
- 4th Photographic Group (later 4th Photographic Reconnaissance and Mapping Group), 23 July 1942
- 1st Photographic Charting Group (later 1st Photographic Group), 11 August 1943, attached from 19 November 1943
- 11th Photographic Group, 1 December 1943
- 311th Photographic Wing (later 311th Reconnaissance Wing), 5 October 1944 – 15 December 1945 (attached to Ninth Air Force, 16 May – 15 November 1945
- 66th Reconnaissance Group, 6 November 1947 – 27 June 1949
- Ninth Air Force (attached to 363d Tactical Reconnaissance Wing, 20 July 1953
- Third Air Force (attached to 47th Bombardment Wing), 7 May 1954
- Twelfth Air Force, 1 December 1956
- 66th Tactical Reconnaissance Group, 1 January 1957
- 66th Tactical Reconnaissance Wing, 8 December 1957 (attached to 10th Tactical Reconnaissance Wing after 8 January 1958
- 10th Tactical Reconnaissance Wing, 8 March 1958
- 26th Tactical Reconnaissance Wing, 1 July 1965
- 25th Tactical Reconnaissance Wing, I October 1965
- 363d Tactical Reconnaissance Wing, 1 September 1966
- 4402d Tactical Training Group, 1 February 1967
- 363d Tactical Reconnaissance Wing, 20 January 1968
- 18th Tactical Fighter Wing, 31 December 1968 – 31 October 1970
- United States Air Forces in Europe Warrior Preparation Center, 11 May 2021 – present

=== Stations ===
- Peterson Field, Colorado, 23 July 1942
- Bradley Field, Connecticut, 17 September 1943 (flight deployed to Mexico City Airport, Mexico, 5 November – 20 December 1943)
- MacDill Field, Florida, 21 January 1944 (air echelon deployed to Cairo Airport, Egypt, 30 January 1944, RAF Deversoir, Egypt, 3 February 1944)
- Buckley Field, Colorado, 26 November 1944 – 6 June 1945 (air echelon remained at RAF Deversoir – c. 31 January 1945, RAF Accra, Gold Coast (now Ghana), c. 1 February 1945, RAF Watton, England, 25 April 1945)
- RAF Thurleigh, England, c. 22 June 1945 (air echelon remained at RAF Watton, England until 16 July 1945)
- Tortorella Airfield, Italy, 20 August 1945
- Foggia Airfield Complex, Italy, 6 September – 15 December 1945
- Newark Army Air Base (later Newark Airport), New Jersey, 6 November 1947 – 27 June 1949
- Shaw Air Force Base, South Carolina, 20 July 1953 – 22 April 1954
- RAF Sculthorpe, England, 11 May 1954
- Spangdahlem Air Base, West Germany, 10 January 1959
- RAF Bruntingthorpe, England, 25 August 1959
- Toul-Rosières Air Base, France 15 August 1962
- Chambley-Bussieres Air Base, France, 1 October 1965
- Shaw Air Force Base, South Carolina, 1 September 1966
- Itazuke Air Base, Japan, 31 December 1968
- Kadena Air Base, Okinawa, 15 May 1969 – 31 October 1970
- Bann, Germany, 11 May 2021 – present

=== Aircraft ===
- Lockheed P-38 Lightning, 1942–1943
- Lockheed F-4 Lightning, 1942–1943
- Boeing B-17 Flying Fortress, 1943–1945
- Boeing F-9 Flying Fortress, 1943–1945
- Consolidated B-24 Liberator, 1943–1945
- Consolidated F-7 Liberator, 1943–1945
- Consolidated F-8 Liberator, 1943–1945
- North American B-25 Mitchell, 1943–1945
- North American F-10 Mitchell, 1943–1945
- Consolidated OA-10 Catalina 1942–1945
- North American RB-45 Tornado, 1953–1957
- Douglas RB-66 Destroyer, 1957–c. 1967
- Douglas EB-66 Destroyer, c. 1967–1970
