= Allison J71 =

Turbojet aircraft engine family

J71
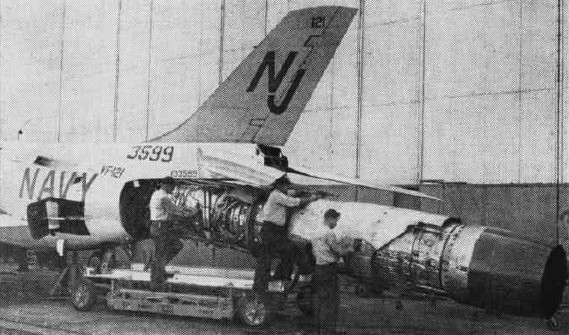
- J71 engine change in progress on a F3H-2 Demon, 1963.
- Type: Turbojet
- Manufacturer: Allison Engine Company
- First run: 1950
- Major applications: B-66 Destroyer; F3H Demon
- Developed from: Allison J35

The Allison J71 was a single spool turbojet engine, designed and built in the United States. It began development in 1948 as a much modified J35, originally designated J35-A-23.

== Operational history ==
The Allison J71 turbojet powered the Douglas B-66 Destroyer and the McDonnell F3H-2 Demon after the failed Westinghouse J40 proved unworkable. The prototype P6M-1 SeaMasters were also fitted with the engine.

== Variants ==
Data from: Aircraft engines of the World 1953

J71-A-1
J71-A-2
Powered the McDonnell F3H Demon
J71-A-2B
J71-A-2E
9,700 lbf (43.15 kN) thrust (14,000 lbf (62.28 kN) thrust with afterburner), for the McDonnell F3H-2 Demon.
YJ71-A-3
7,000 lbf (31.14 kN) thrust (9,500 lbf (42.26 kN) thrust with afterburner)
J71-A-4
Afterburning turbojet engines for the Martin XP6M-1 Seamaster flying boat prototypes.
J71-A-6
Afterburning turbojet engines for the Martin YP6M-1 Seamaster pre-production flying boats.
J71-A-7
14,000 lbf (62.28 kN) thrust with afterburner
J71-A-9
Powered the Douglas RB-66 Destroyer
J71-A-11
10,200 lbf (45.37 kN) thrust
J71-A-13

== Specifications (Allison J71-A-2) ==
Data from Aircraft engines of the World 1957

==== General characteristics ====
- Type: afterburning turbojet
- Length: 284.5 in (7,230 mm)
- Diameter: 39.5 in (1,000 mm)
- Frontal area: 8.5 sq ft (0.79 m^{2})
- Dry weight: 4,890 lb (2,220 kg)

==== Components ====
- Compressor: 16-stage axial compressor
- Combustors: cannular with 10 flame tubes
- Turbine: 3-stage axial
- Fuel type: JP-4 / aviation kerosene
- Oil system: pressure spray with scavenge at 10–60 psi (69–414 kPa)

==== Performance ====
- Maximum thrust: take-off, dry 10,000 lbf (44,000 N); take-off, wet 14,000 lbf (62.28 kN)
- Overall pressure ratio: 8.0:1
- Air mass flow: 160 lb/s (73 kg/s) at 6,100 rpm (static)
- Specific fuel consumption: 1.8 lb/(lbf⋅h) (51 g/(kN⋅s)) with afterburner (wet)
- Thrust-to-weight ratio: 2.857

== See also ==
Related development

- Allison J35

Related lists

- List of aircraft engines
