= List of Norfolk airfields =

This is a list of current or former airfields, airports and airbases, both civilian and military, within the English county of Norfolk, East Anglia. They may have been used by the Royal Flying Corps (RFC), Royal Naval Air Service (RNAS), Royal Air Force (RAF), Army Air Corps (AAC), Fleet Air Arm (FAA), United States Army Air Forces (USAAF) or the United States Air Force (USAF).

For a list of current RAF stations in the UK and abroad, see List of Royal Air Force stations and for former stations see List of former Royal Air Force stations.

Name	Alt Name	Used by	Dates	Current use	Notes
Felthorpe Airfield		Private	1958–current	Grass runway	
Little Snoring Airfield	RAF Little Snoring	RAF, now Private	1943–58 (RAF)	2,526 ft & 1,620 ft Concrete/asphalt runways	former RAF Bomber Station.
Ludham Airfield	RAF Ludham, (HMS Flycatcher)	RAF, RNAS, now Private	1941–46 (RAF)	1,801 ft Concrete runway	Allocated to US 8th AF as Station 177, but used by RAF and RNAS.
North Denes Airport	Great Yarmouth Heliport	Private		1,575 ft Unpaved runway	(ICAO: EGSD)
Northrepps Aerodrome		Private		2,018 ft & 1,263 ft Grass runway	
Norwich International Airport	RAF Horsham St Faith, USAAF Station 123 (8th AF)	RAF, USAAF now Public Airport	1940-1967 (RAF)	6,040 ft & 4,154 ft Concrete/asphalt runways	(IATA: NWI, ICAO: EGSH)
Seething Airfield	RAF Seething, USAAF Station 146 (8th AF)	RAF, USAAF now Private	1943–45 (USAAF)	2,624 ft Asphalt runway	(ICAO: EGSJ)
Shipdham Airfield	RAF Shipdham, USAAF Station 115 (8th AF)	RAF, USAAF now Private	1942–57	2,828 ft Asphalt runway	(ICAO: EGSA)
RAF Weybourne	Weybourne Airfield	Private		Grass runway	
RAF Attlebridge	USAAF Station 120 (Eighth Air Force)	RAF, USAAF	June 1941 – 5 August 1956	Farmland	
RAF Bacton	RNAS Bacton	RNAS, RAF	1915 – March 1919	Farmland	First World War Landing Ground.
RAF Barton Bendish		RAF	September 1939 – October 1942	Farmland	Second World War Landing Ground (satellite to Marham).
RAF Bircham Newton		RAF, FAA	May 1918 – December 1962	Now a training establishment to the civil Construction Industry Training Board	Second World War Landing Ground.
RAF Bodney	USAAF Station 141 (8th AF)	RAF, USAAF	March 1940 – November 1945	Farmland	Second World War Landing Ground.
RAF Burgh Castle	RNAS Burgh Castle	RNAS, RAF	1915–1919	Open Land	First World War Landing Ground.
RAF Bylaugh Hall		RAF	1943–1945	Private ownership	Headquarters of No. 100 Group RAF.
RAF Coltishall	USAAF Station 355 (8th AF)	RAF, USAAF	May 1940 – November 2006	HMP Bure	The last operational WW2 airfield, closed in 2006, known as MoD Coltishall until its disposal.
RAF Deopham Green	USAAF Station 142 (8th AF)	RAF, USAAF	January 1944 – January 1948	Farmland	Second World War Landing Ground.
RAF Docking		RAF	July 1940 – September 1946	Farmland	
RAF Downham Market		RAF	1942 – October 1946	Bexwell Industrial Estate	
RAF East Wretham	USAAF Station 133 (8th AF)	RAF, USAAF	1940 – July 1948	British Army use	
RAF Feltwell		RFC, RAF, USAF	November 1917 – Present	Housing and education for USAF personnel	
RAF Fersfield	USAAF Station 140 / 554 (8th AF)	RAF, USAAF	1944 – March 1946	Farmland	
RAF Foulsham		RAF	May 1942 – June 1962	Farmland/Industry	
RAF Great Massingham		RAF	July 1940 – November 1950 (closed to flying)	Farmland/Limited Flying	Bomber station.
RAF Great Yarmouth	RNAS Great Yarmouth	RNAS, RAF	April 1913 – November 1920	Camp Site	Land and seaplane base during WWI. In WW2 used by No. 16 Recruits Centre from 1941–1946 (AIR 29/504)
RAF Hardwick	USAAF Station 104 (8th AF)	RAF, USAAF	September 1942 – August 1946	Farmland/Limited Flying	
RAF Harling Road	RFC Harling Road (Roudham)	RFC, RAF	December 1916 – March 1920	Industry	First World War.
RAF Hethel	USAAF Station 114 (8th AF)	RAF, USAAF	1942 – June 1948	Lotus Cars/Hethel Engineering Centre	
RNAS Hickling Broads		RAF	August 1918 – September 1919	Moorings	
RAF Hingham	RFC Hingham	RFC, RAF	1916–1919	Farmland	First World War Landing Ground.
RAF Holt	RNAS Holt	RNAS, RAF	November 1915 – 1920s	Farming/ Open land	First World War Landing Ground.
RAF Horsham St Faith	see Norwich International Airport				
RAF Knettishall	USAAF Station 136 (8th AF)	RAF, USAAF	January 1943 – 1957	Farmland	
RAF Langham		RAF, FAA	1940–1961	Turkey farm/Heritage site	Joint Fleet Air Arm/RAF.
RAF Little Snoring	see Little Snoring Airfield (above)				
RAF Ludham	see Ludham Airfield (above)				
RAF Marham	RFC Marham	RFC, RAF	1916–1919, 1935–present	Current home to the Lockheed Martin F-35 Lightning II	
RAF Matlaske	USAAF Station 178 (8th AF)	RAF, USAAF	1940–1946	Farmland	
RAF Mattishall	RFC Mattishall	RFC, RAF	November 1915 – May 1919	Farmland	First World War.
RAF Methwold		RAF	1938–1958	Farmland/industry	
RAF Mousehold Heath	RFC Mousehold Heath, Norwich Municipal Airport	RFC, Civil, RAF	1914–1933	Housing Estate & Light Industry	
RAF Narborough	RNAS Narborough, RFC Narborough	RNAS, RFC, RAF	August 1915 – December 1919	Farmland	
RAF North Creake	Code Name: WORKER	RAF (No. 100 Group, 199 & 171 Sqns)	1943–1947	Farmland/housing/industry	The Control Tower is now a bed and breakfast, with the rest of the site in agricultural use with some light industry in the former airfield buildings.
RAF North Pickenham	USAAF Station 143	RAF, USAAF	1944–1963	Runways used by Bernard Matthews as bases for turkey sheds. Thor IRBM site now used by Anglia Karting.	Thor IBRM station 1958–1963.
RAF Old Buckenham	USAAF Station 144 (8th AF)	RAF, USAAF	1943–1960	Old Buckenham Airport	
RAF Oulton		RAF	July 1940 – August 1952	Farmland	
RAF Pulham	RNAS Pulham	RNAS, RAF	1915–1948	Farmland	Used for the development of British airships between the wars, hangar moved to Cardington (Bedfordshire), used as crashed aircraft dump in WW2.
RAF Rackheath	USAAF Station 145 (8th AF)	RAF, USAAF	1944–1945	Farmland/industrial	
RAF Sculthorpe		RAF, USAAF, USAF	January 1943 – October 1992	Housing/industry/MoD training area	
RAF Sedgeford	RNAS Sedgeford, RFC Sedgeford	RNAS, RFC, RAF	1915–1919, 1940–1944	Farmland	Used as decoy airfield during WWII.
RAF Seething	see Seething Airfield (above)				
RAF Shipdham	see Shipdham Airfield (above)				
RAF Snetterton Heath	USAAF Station 138 (8th AF)	RAF, USAAF	1943–1952	Snetterton Motor Racing Circuit	
RAF Swannington		RAF	April 1944 – November 1947	Farmland/industry	
RAF Swanton Morley	Robertson Barracks	RAF, Army	1940–present	Robertson Barracks	
RAF Thetford	RFC Thetford (Snarehill)	RFC, RAF	1915–1920, 1940–1942	Farmland	Used as decoy airfield during WWII.
RAF Thorpe Abbotts	USAAF Station 139 (8th AF)	RAF, USAAF	1943–1956	Farmland/civil aviation	Home of 100th Bomb Group Memorial Museum.
RAF Tibenham	RFC Tibenham, USAAF Station 124 (8th AF)	RFC, RAF, USAAF	1916–1920, 1942–1959	Airfield	Now owned by Norfolk Gliding Club.
RAF Watton	USAAF Station 376 / 505	RAF, USAAF	1939–1992	Housing/civil aviation/army training/HM Prison Wayland	
RAF Wendling	USAAF Station 118 (8th AF)	RAF, USAAF	1943–1961	Farmland	
RAF West Raynham		RAF, FAA	May 1939 – June 1994	Farmland/housing	
