= RAF Swannington =

Former Royal Air Force station in Norfolk, England

RAF Swannington
- Swannington, Norfolk in England

Site information
- Type: Royal Air Force station
- Owner: Air Ministry
- Operator: Royal Air Force
- Controlled by: RAF Bomber Command; RAF Maintenance Command

Location
- Shown within Norfolk
- Coordinates: 52.742°N 1.172°E

Site history
- Built: 1942
- In use: 1944-1947
- Battles/wars: Second World War

Garrison information
- Garrison: No. 100 Group RAF

Airfield information
Runways
Direction	Length and surface
00/00	Concrete
00/00	Concrete
00/00	Concrete

Royal Air Force Swannington or more simply RAF Swannington is a former Royal Air Force station located 1.9 miles (3.1 km) south of Cawston and 9.3 miles (15.0 km) north west of Norwich in Norfolk, England.

It was opened in April 1944, being developed from the estate of Haveringland Hall, and sold in 1957, though the Royal Air Force (RAF) left in November 1947. The site is now used for agriculture, though evidence of concrete runways and buildings remains; it lies largely within the civil parishes of Brandiston, with St Nicholas' Church to the north of the site, and Haveringland, with St Peter's Church close to one of the taxiways at the eastern end, and Guton Hall and a river valley separating the area from Little Witchingham civil parish to the west. Part of the Brandiston-Swannington road still runs over remains of the runways.

== History ==
The first squadrons to use Swannington were No. 85 Squadron RAF, which moved from RAF West Malling, and No. 157 Squadron RAF from RAF Valley; these were under the command of No. 100 Group RAF and flew de Havilland Mosquitos. These squadrons supported bombing support operations as part of RAF Bomber Command.

Both squadrons were temporarily moved to RAF West Malling to counter the V-1 flying bomb threat before returning in late August 1944 to re-commence bomber support operations. On 27 June 1945 85 Squadron moved to RAF Castle Camps; and shortly after, on 16 August 1945, 157 Squadron disbanded, and the airfield was passed over to RAF Maintenance Command.

Swannington was the headquarters for No. 274 Maintenance Unit RAF (MU) for RAF Little Snoring, RAF North Creake and RAF Oulton. All these stations had mothballed Mosquitos of all versions, and there were also several hundred new Rolls-Royce Merlin engines in their crates. Between 1946 and 1947 the role of the site was to service and carry out important modifications to aircraft before they were flown out to a permanent MU for in-depth service, from where they were sold to foreign powers. Airframes which were beyond their sell-by date were towed to the dump and burnt after recovery of spare parts, including engines.

Other units

- No. 451 Squadron RAAF
- No. 229 Squadron RAF

== Current use ==
Haveringland Hall was demolished c. 1948. Many Nissen huts were sited in the extensively wooded and landscaped garden. After the decommissioning of the RAF station, these grounds were used for a caravan and camping ground.
