= RAF North Creake =

Former RAF station in Norfolk, England

RAF North Creake
- Fakenham, Norfolk in England

Site information
- Type: Royal Air Force station
- Owner: Air Ministry
- Operator: Royal Air Force

Location
- Shown within Norfolk
- Coordinates: 52°54′38″N 000°49′17″E

Site history
- Built: 1942
- In use: 1943-1947
- Battles/wars: Second World War

Airfield information
- Elevation: 73 metres (240 ft) AMSL
Runways
Direction	Length and surface
01/19	1,315 metres (4,314 ft) Concrete
04/22	1,720 metres (5,643 ft) Concrete
13/31	1,315 metres (4,314 ft) Concrete

Royal Air Force North Creake or more simply RAF North Creake is a former Royal Air Force station located 3.3 miles (5.3 km) southwest of Wells-next-the-Sea, Norfolk and 5.7 miles (9.2 km) northwest of Fakenham, Norfolk, England.

== History ==
=== Second World War ===
Originally used in 1941 as a decoy site for RAF Docking, construction of this Class A airfield began in October 1942, with the station being provided with accommodation for 2,951 male and 411 female staff. The airfield had 36 loop type hardstandings, two T2 hangars and one B1 hangar.

By December 1943 the airfield had passed to 100 Group, although it did not immediately become operational as consideration was given to upgrading the airfield to Very Heavy Bomber Standard. In the event, this did not take place, with RAF Sculthorpe being selected for upgrade.

Short Stirling III's from 199 Squadron arrived in May 1944 to complete Window and Mandrel operations against enemy radar tracking of Bomber Command raids, however during March 1945 these were changed to Handley Page Halifax III's. In September 1944, No. 199's 'C' Flight was used to re-form 171 Squadron, who contributed to 100 Group's radio counter-measures activities with Halifaxes.

Seventeen aircraft were lost during operations from the airfield, eight Stirlings and nine Halifaxes.

=== Post-war ===
After the War, the airfield was used for the storage and scrapping of aircraft, mostly de Havilland Mosquitoes by No. 274 Maintenance Unit RAF.

== Current use ==
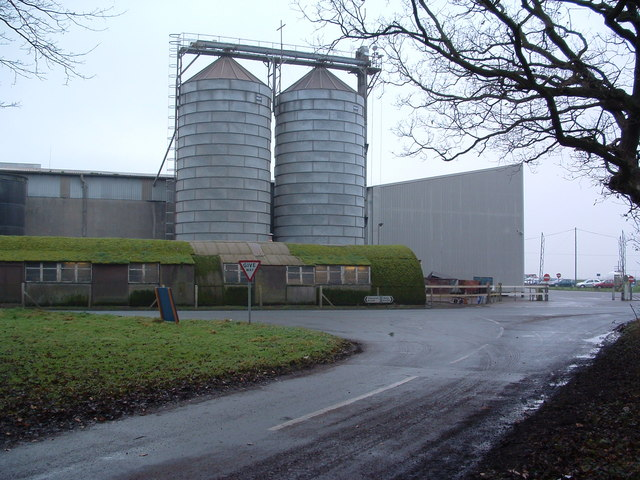
A small part of the airfield is now business premises of ABN animal feedstuffs. In the foreground are moss covered Nissen huts

The RAF relinquished the station in 1947, and the area is now used for agriculture, though some evidence of runways, buildings and facilities remains.

The control tower survives, and has been converted into a house, offering bed and breakfast. The Stagecoach in Norfolk bus company in March 2016 registered the setting up of an Operating Centre on this site for 10 vehicles.

== See also ==
- List of former Royal Air Force stations
- List of Royal Air Force aircraft squadrons
