= Michael Renaut =

Michael Renaut (29 September 1920 – 31 January 1964) was a RAF pilot and author.

In August 1940 he joined the RAF as a bomber pilot. He was posted to No. 78 Squadron RAF (July 1941), then to No. 76 Squadron RAF and finally to No. 171 Squadron RAF in No. 100 Group RAF, ending his career as Wing Commander.

He was the first to drop an 8,000 lbs bomb over Germany during a raid over Essen on the night of 10 April 1942.

He won a United Kingdom Distinguished Flying Cross and a United States Distinguished Flying Cross.

He was married to Yvonne Renaut and had two children Alan and Alison.

He could also write the Lords Prayer on the back of a postage stamp.

He was an eye-witness of the 1952 Farnborough Airshow DH.110 crash.

== Author ==
He wrote Terror by Night (published posthumously in 1982) an account of his war experiences.
