= Sculthorpe Training Area =

Former Royal Air Force station, now military training site in Norfolk, England

Sculthorpe Training Area previously RAF Sculthorpe
- Near Fakenham, Norfolk in England
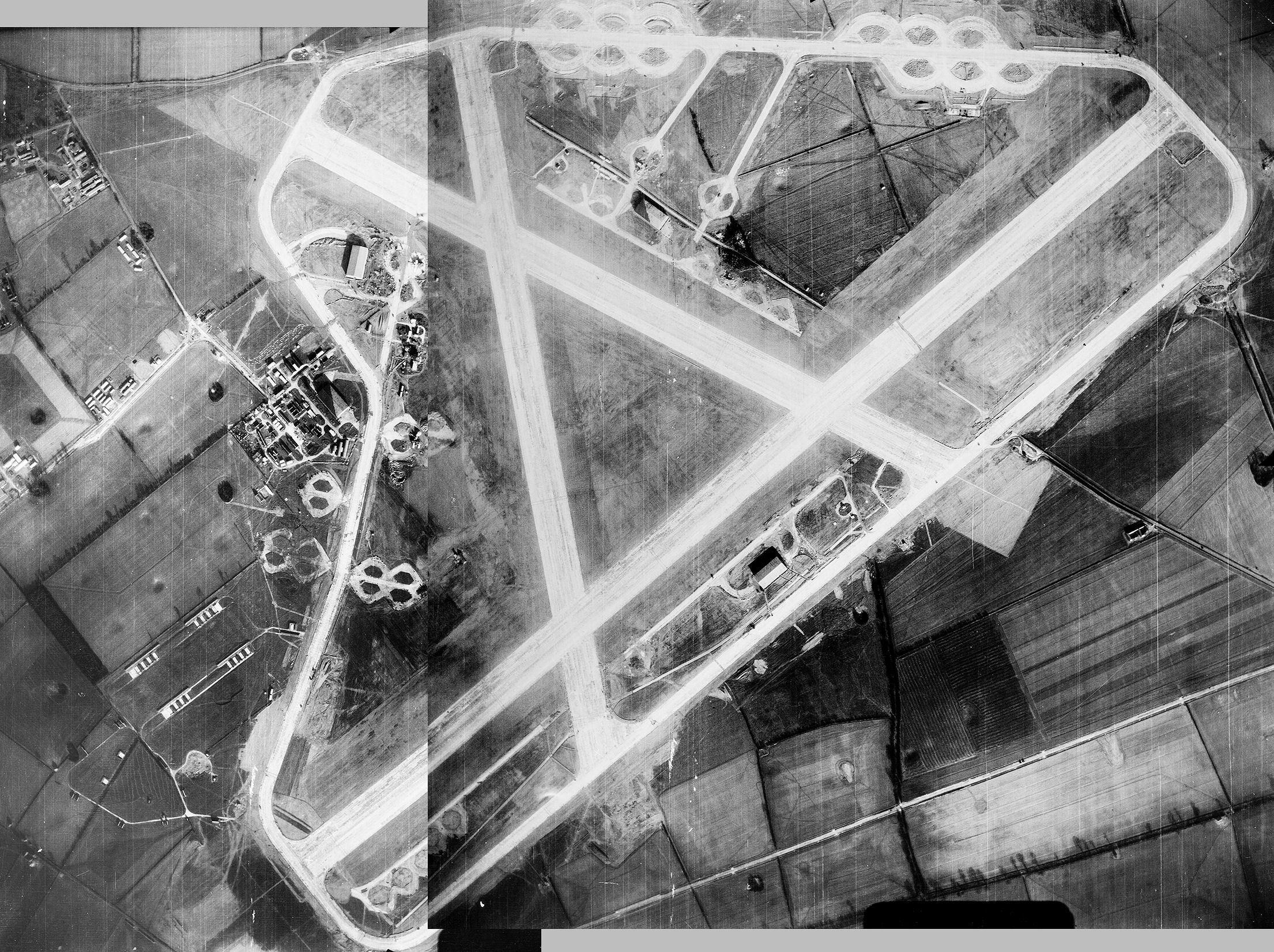
- 1946 aerial photograph of RAF Sculthorpe

Site information
- Type: Royal Air Force flying station (former), relief military training airfield (current)
- Code: SCTH (SPEC 024 Code)
- Owner: Ministry of Defence (MoD)
- Operator: Royal Air Force (1943–1945); United States Air Force (1952–1992)
- Open to the public: airfield & MOD training areas closed to public
- Condition: airfield in continued (limited) military use

Location
- Location in Norfolk RAF Sculthorpe (the United Kingdom)
- Coordinates: 52°50′54″N 000°45′38″E
- Grid reference: TF 85993 31439
- Area: 539 hectares (1,332 acres)
- Height: 65 metres (213 ft)

Site history
- Built: 1942
- Built by: Bovis Construction
- In use: 15 January 1943 – 2 October 1992
- Fate: airfield retained by MoD; now known as Sculthorpe Training Area; technical and administrative buildings, and base housing sold off

Airfield information
- Identifiers: IATA: ~~ZXE~~, ICAO: EGUP
Runways
Direction	Length and surface
06/24	2,743 metres (9,000 ft) asphalt concrete
13/31	1,829 metres (6,000 ft) concrete
18/36	1,829 metres (6,000 ft) asphalt concrete

Sculthorpe Training Area, previously Royal Air Force Sculthorpe / (RAF Sculthorpe), is a military training site administered by the Defence Training Estate, part of the Ministry of Defence (MoD). It is approximately 3 miles (4.8 kilometres) west of Fakenham in the county of Norfolk in England.

The training area occupies the larger part of the former RAF Sculthorpe, a military airbase used by RAF bombers in the later stages of the Second World War (1942–45), by United States Air Forces in Europe (USAFE) units from 1952 to 1962, and thereafter temporary visiting airmen and support crews of both the Royal Air Force (RAF) and United States Air Force (USAF) until its closure as an active airfield on 2 October 1992. In 1997, the Ministry of Defence sold the technical, domestic and administrative site, but retained the airfield itself, including the runways, taxiways, dispersal areas and the adjacent dispersed secure weapon storage area.

== History ==
=== Second World War ===
RAF Sculthorpe was built between the villages of Sculthorpe (to its east) and Syderstone (to its west-north-west) as the second satellite airfield of RAF West Raynham (itself a few miles to the south), the first satellite airfield being RAF Great Massingham. Work began on Sculthorpe in the spring of 1942, and the airfield was laid out as one of only two Royal Air Force (RAF) heavy bomber airfields (the other was the nearby RAF Marham), with the familiar wartime triangular three runway layout expanded by 50 per cent, the main runway being 9,000 feet (2,743 metres) long (compared to the standard 6,000 feet (1,829 metres)) and the subsidiary runways being 6,000 feet (compared to around 4,000 feet (1,219 metres)). The work involved construction of the concrete runways, dispersals site, mess facilities, and accommodation. Much of the work was completed by Irish labour working for the company Bovis Construction.

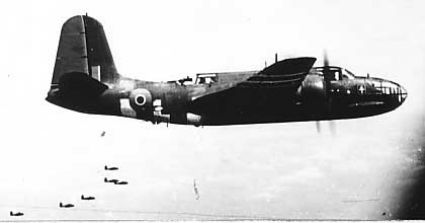
Douglas Boston, 342 'Lorraine' (Free French) sqdn, RAF

As work was drawing to a close in May 1943, the first aircraft squadrons started to arrive. The first was No. 342 Squadron (Lorraine) of the Free French Air Forces within No. 2 Group RAF from RAF West Raynham. This squadron operated two flights of the Douglas Boston aircraft, along with the related Douglas Havoc aircraft for training. No. 342 Squadron stayed until 19 July 1943, when they moved to RAF Great Massingham.

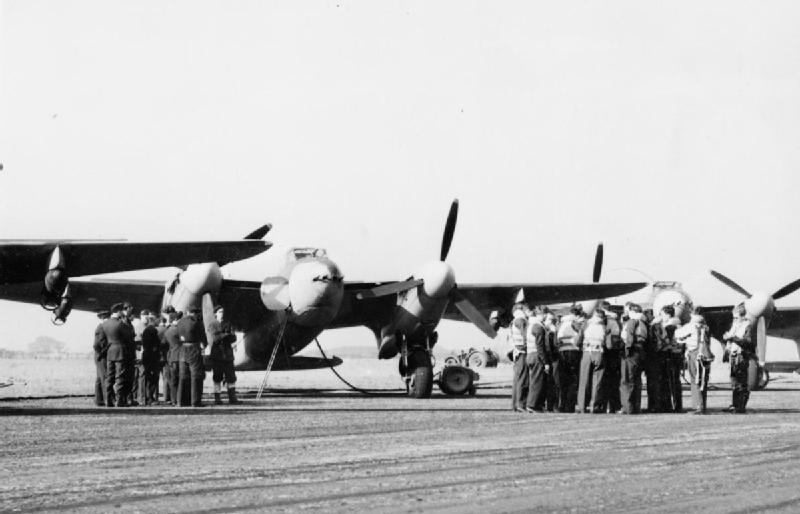
487 Squadron RNZAF Mosquito aircrew briefing Sculthorpe 1943

On 20 July 1943, the Royal New Zealand Air Force (RNZAF) and Royal Australian Air Force (RAAF) moved in with No. 487 Squadron RNZAF and No. 464 Squadron RAAF taking up residence, with their Lockheed Ventura aircraft having moved from RAF Methwold, before converting at Sculthorpe onto the de Havilland Mosquito. On 20 September 1943, 21 Squadron moved in from RAF Oulton, also with Mosquitos, to form the Sculthorpe Wing (No. 140 Wing RAF). The wing stayed at Sculthorpe, completing more than 100 missions, before departing for RAF Hunsdon in Hertfordshire on 31 December 1943.

In January 1944, No. 214 Squadron RAF of 100 Group RAF moved in with Boeing Fortress II aircraft for use in electronic warfare support of RAF Bomber Command, to be joined by crews from the United States Army Air Forces (USAAF) 96th Bomb Group from RAF Snetterton Heath, known at Sculthorpe and thereafter as the 803rd Bomb Squadron of the USAAF. In April 1944, the 803rd and 214 Squadron departed for RAF Oulton, leaving Sculthorpe empty for its redevelopment as a 'very heavy bomber base', with the work not being completed until the spring of 1946.

A number of units were also posted here:

- No. 11 Heavy Glider Maintenance Section RAF
- No. 140 Airfield Headquarters RAF
- No. 1699 (Fortress Training) Flight RAF
- No. 2755 Squadron RAF Regiment
- No. 3207 Servicing Commando RAF
- Mosquito Conversion Flight RAF

=== Cold War ===
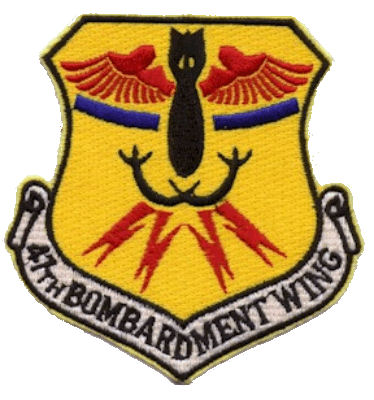
47th Bombardment Wing patch

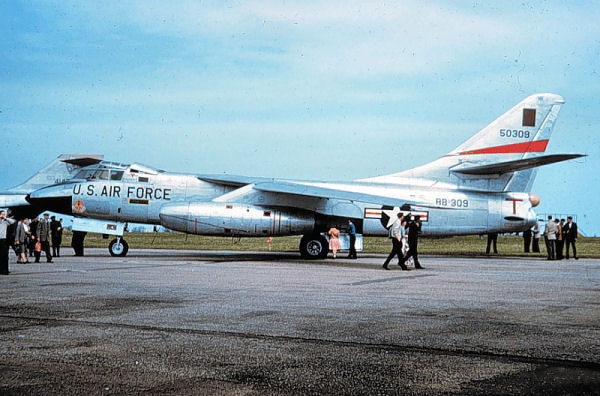
Douglas B-66B-DL Destroyer, serial 55-0309, of the 84th Bomb Squadron, at RAF Wethersfield, May 1959

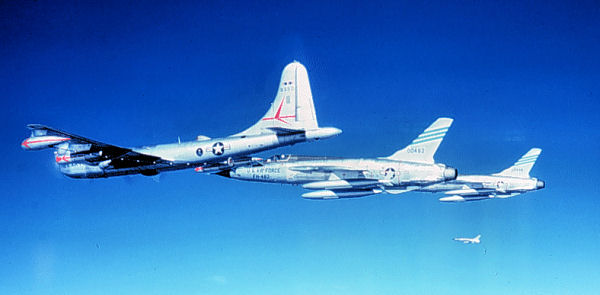
A KB-50J Superfortress of the 420th Air Refueling Squadron from RAF Sculthorpe refuelling two 36th TFW Republic F-105D fighter jets over West Germany, circa 1961-63

RAF Sculthorpe was refurbished for use by the United States Air Force (USAF) during the Berlin Crisis in 1949, and then later, in 1952, it became home for the 49th Air Division (Operational) (49th AD) and the 47th Bombardment Wing (47th Bomb Wg), who were to stay for a decade. The 49th Air Division maintained operational control of the 47th Bomb Wg and the 20th Fighter-Bomber Wing (20th FB Wg), which provided tactical nuclear weapons support to the Supreme Allied Commander Europe (SACEUR). Later, the 81st Fighter-Bomber Wing (81st FB Wg) was provided a nuclear capability and assigned to the operational control of the 49th Air Division.

The Soviet Union's enormous conventional force in eastern Europe posed a major problem for NATO, due to the Soviets' maintaining high personnel levels after World War II, when most of the American and British forces had demobilised.

To counter this Soviet threat to Western Europe, NATO decided to expand their tactical nuclear force by introducing the North American B-45 Tornado to the United Kingdom. The U.S. Tactical Air Command had about 100 of these four-engine jet bombers, each capable of delivering five tactical nuclear bombs. In the summer of 1952, The Pentagon decided to forward-deploy the 47th Bomb Wing to Sculthorpe in Norfolk, from its then home base of Langley Air Force Base in Virginia, USA. The movement of the 49th AD, 47 Bomb Wg and the 20th FB Wg was the first unit deployment since World War II.

47th Bombardment Wing squadrons and their aircraft based at RAF Sculthorpe
unit	aircraft	from	to
84th Bombardment Squadron	B-45, B-66	17 November 1952	22 June 1962
85th Bombardment Squadron	B-45, B-66	17 November 1952	22 June 1962
86th Bombardment Squadron	B-45, B-66	23 March 1954	22 June 1962
19th Tactical Reconnaissance Squadron	RB-45C	7 May 1954	1 December 1958
420th Air Refueling Squadron	KB-29, KB-50	25 September 1955	23 March 1962

Due to a shortage of space at Sculthorpe, the 86th BS operated from RAF Alconbury as a detachment of the 47th. In addition to the B-45 squadrons at Sculthorpe, the 47th's sister wing, the 20th Fighter-Bomber Wing with the nuclear capable North American F-84G Thunderjet were transferred to RAF Wethersfield in Essex.

From 1954 to 1958, the 19th Tactical Reconnaissance Squadron (19th TRS) also flew the aerial reconnaissance version of the North American B-45 Tornado known as the RB-45. The 19th TRS was assigned to the 47th Bomb Wing from May 1954 to December 1958. When the 19th TRS began to re-equip with Douglas RB-66's in 1957, its RB-45's were transferred to other squadrons of the 47th Bomb Wing.

Three USAF reconnaissance squadrons conducted Ferret missions during the 1950s.

By 1957, hosting 10,000 personnel it was the biggest United States Air Forces in Europe (USAFE) base in Europe. In May 1958, the re-equipping of the 47th Bombardment Wing began and Douglas B-66 Destroyers began to replace the B-45s. With this equipment change, the 47th's squadrons were redesignated 'Bombardment Squadron (Tactical)'.

During 1960 to 1962, the 47th performed aerial refuelling missions assigning Boeing KB-50J tankers to the 420th Air Refueling Squadron from 15 March 1960 to 22 June 1962. The KB-50s were specially equipped with two General Electric J47 turbojet engines that enabled the tanker aircraft to match the speed of the faster jet fighters during refuelling; however most of the KB-50s were more than fifteen years old, and were too slow to refuel the faster tactical jets of USAFE. The 420th ARS was inactivated on 25 March 1964.

In 1962, Project Clearwater halted large scale rotational bomber deployments to Britain with Sculthorpe, along with RAF Fairford, RAF Chelveston, and RAF Greenham Common, being turned over to USAFE for tactical air use. As a result, the 47th Bomb Wing was inactivated on 22 June 1962. A number of the aircraft were reassigned to the 42d Tactical Reconnaissance Squadron (42nd TRS), 10th Tactical Reconnaissance Wing at RAF Chelveston, and modified with the electronic counter-measures tail system. With the inactivation of the 47th, Sculthorpe was put under the command of the 7375th Combat Support Group, the 7375th was later replaced by the Detachment 1, 48th Tactical Fighter Wing.

=== Temporary Deployments (1962 - 1992) ===
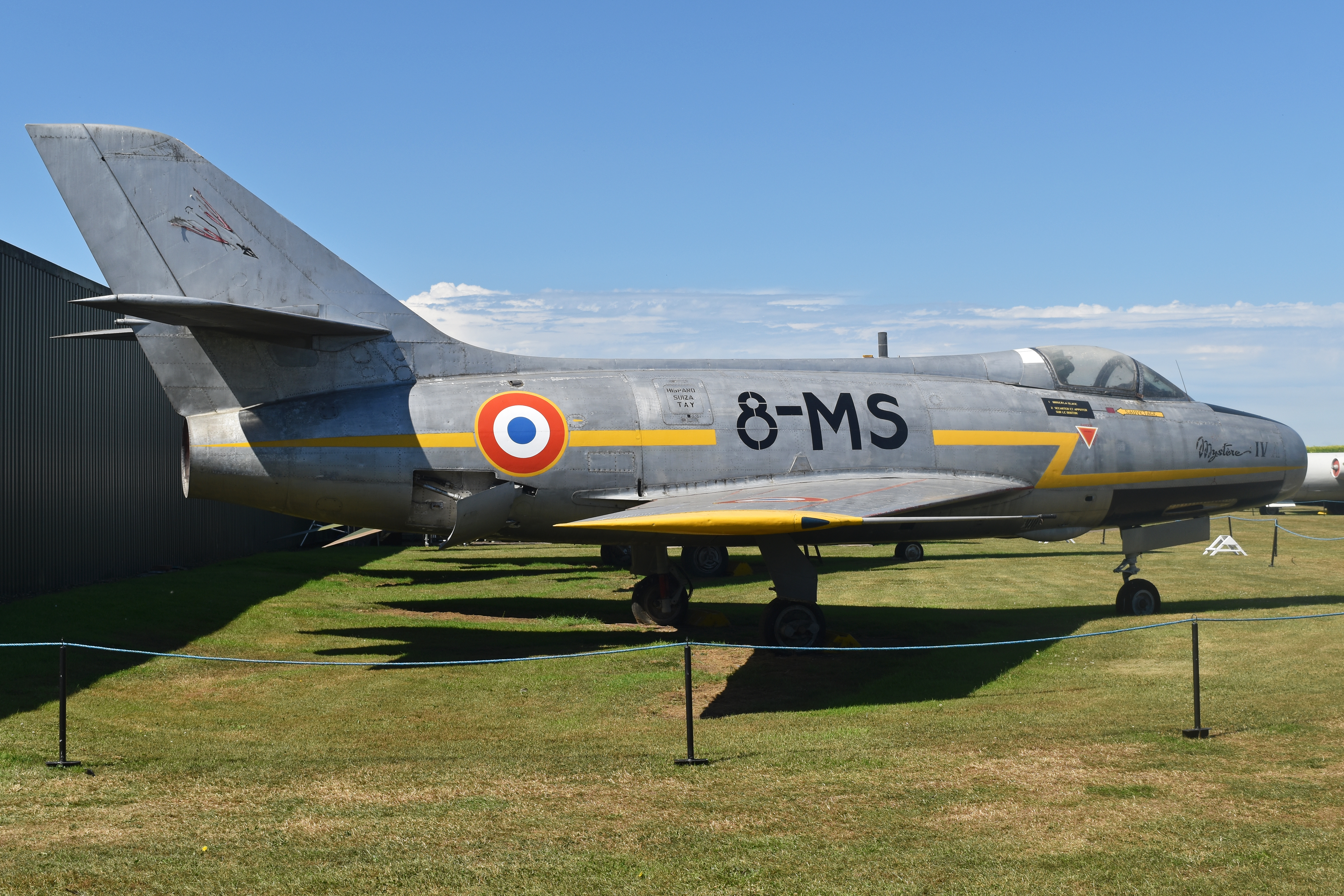
This French AF Dassault Mystère IVA passed through RAF Sculthorpe 1978

Following the inactivation of the 47th BW in 1962, no aircraft were permanently based at RAF Sculthorpe, although it regularly hosted visiting units. These frequently included aircraft flown over from the US and remaining at Sculthorpe for several weeks, e.g. as part of the Coronet series of exercises such as Coronet Castle / Checkered Flag, March 1983.

The annual JCET Exercise Flintlock has frequently involved RAF Sculthorpe, for instance Flintlock V (1972), Flintlock 86, Flintlock 88.

Between 1976 and 1978, numbers of French AF North American F-100 Super Sabres, Dassault Mystère IVA, and Lockheed T-33A originally financed under the American Mutual Assistance Program were returned to US ownership and flown to Sculthorpe for de-commissioning.

Between May and June 1978, 18 Republic F-105D Thunderchiefs from 465th TFS, Tinker AFB, Oklahoma were deployed to Sculthorpe under Coronet Oriole.

In 1979, Handley Page Victor aerial tankers from 55 and 57 Squadrons, and Canberra target towing aircraft of 100 Squadron operated from Sculthorpe when the runway at RAF Marham was re-surfaced.

In spring 1982, units from RAF Coltishall in north-east Norfolk moved to Sculthorpe while the Coltishall runway was resurfaced.

In April 1983 24 A-7Ds from Ohio ANG were deployed to Sculthorpe as part of Exercise Coronet Castle.

During the spring and summer of 1983, units of the 48th Tactical Fighter Wing deployed to RAF Sculthorpe because their home station, RAF Lakenheath was having its runway resurfaced.

During the summer of 1984, the McDonnell Douglas F-4 Phantom II F-4E and F-4G squadrons from Spangdahlem Air Base, West Germany, operated from RAF Sculthorpe to allow runway re-surfacing at Spangdahlem to take place.

In June/July 1986 24 A-7Ds from Ohio ANG were deployed to Sculthorpe as part of Exercise Coronet Miami.

During most of 1988 and part of 1989, USAF Lockheed C-130 Hercules units from the 314th Airlift Wing, 317th Airlift Group, and 463rd Tactical Airlift Wing, on TDY rotation in Europe, re-located to RAF Sculthorpe due to runway resurfacing at RAF Mildenhall.

In June 1989 A-7Ds from Ohio ANG were once again deployed to Sculthorpe, Exercise Coronet Pine. During June - August 1989, the Lockheed TR-1A squadron from RAF Alconbury operated from RAF Sculthorpe whilst Alconbury's runway was re-surfaced.

== Post RAF use ==
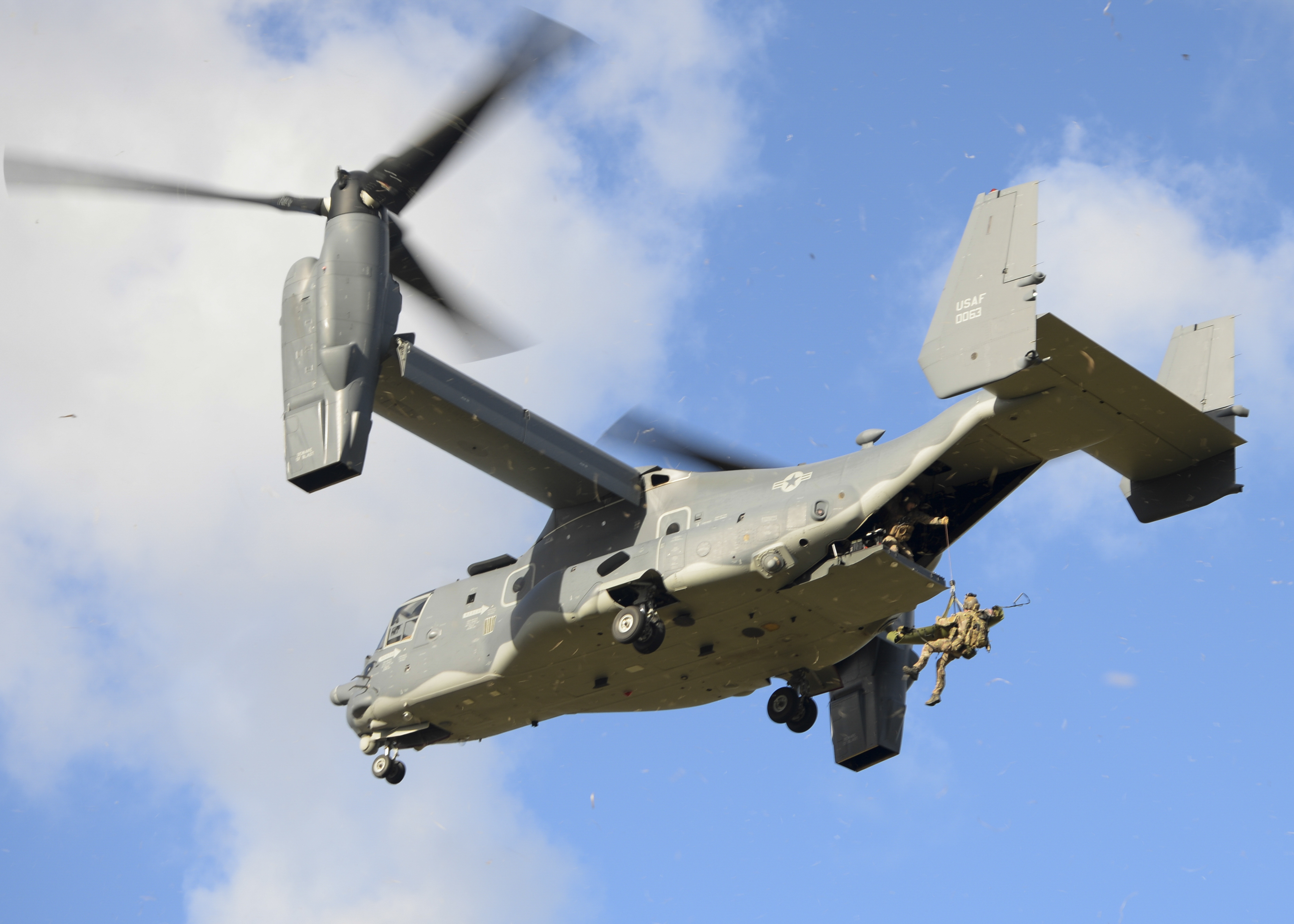
USAF Air Commandos operating from CV-22B at Sculthorpe Training Area, March 2015

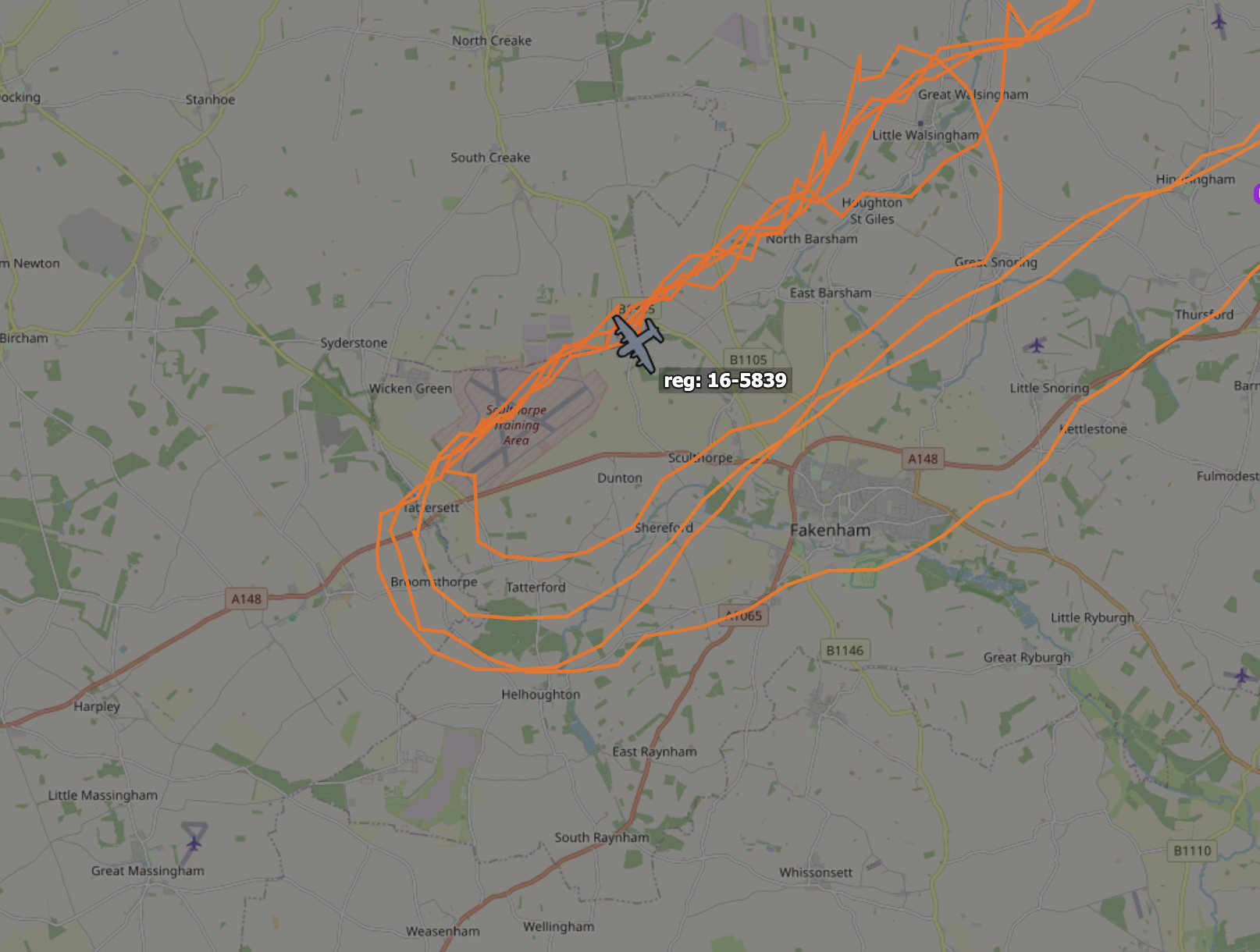
ADSB data showing USAF MC-130J activity at RAF Sculthorpe, April 2024

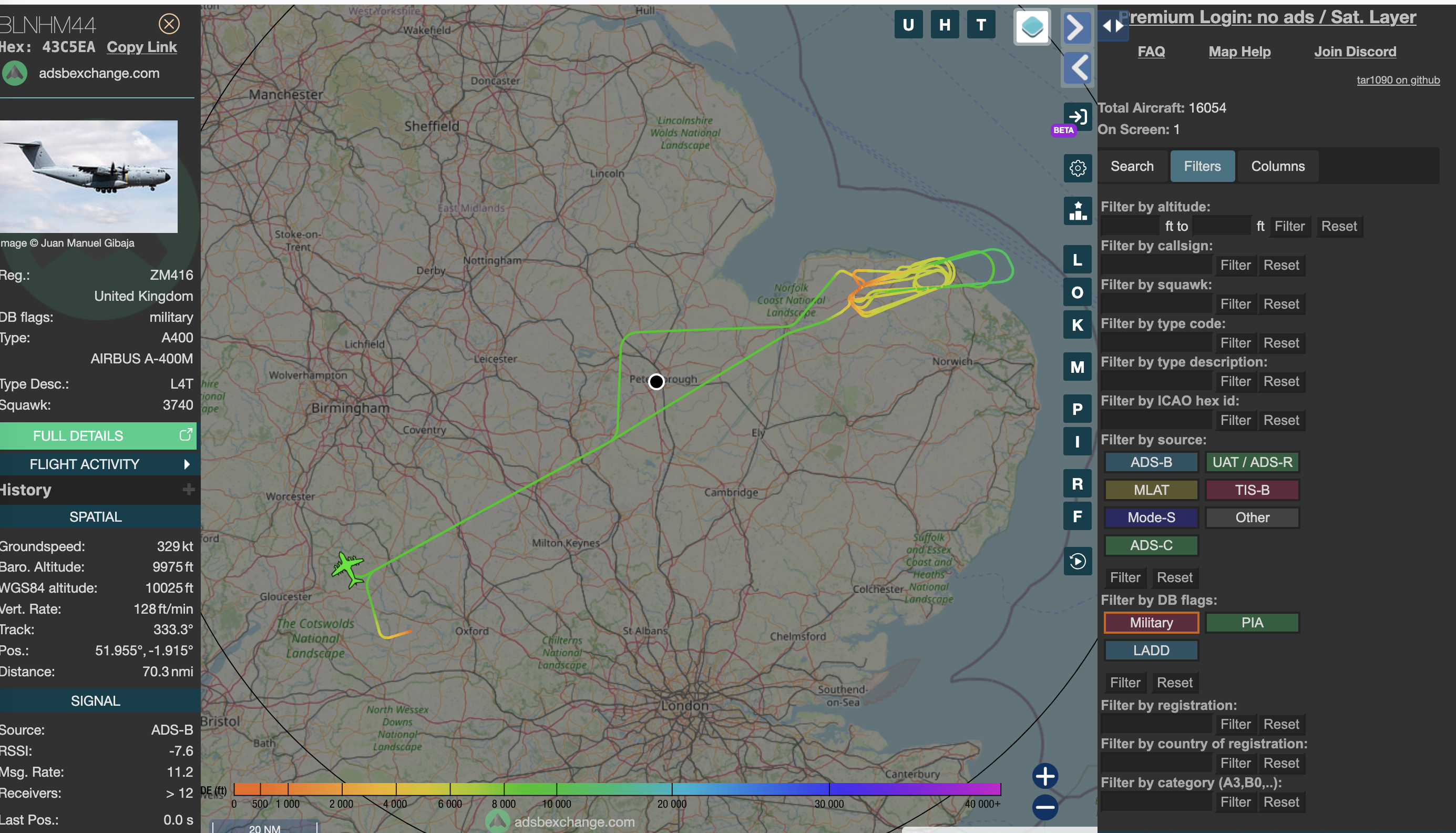
ADSB data showing RAF activity at Sculthorpe on 7th March 2025

Royal Air Force Sculthorpe was officially closed on 2 October 1992. However, the airfield itself, together with the dispersed secure weapon storage area, was retained by the Ministry of Defence (MoD), and continues to be used by the USAF 352nd Special Operations Wing based at RAF Mildenhall, to perform training in low flying airdrops and rescue and recovery missions. These exercises are conducted by Lockheed MC-130 Hercules and CV-22 Ospreys. In October 2022, a AgustaWestland Apache AH.1, military registration ZJ221, operated by the Army Air Corps (AAC) from Wattisham Flying Station (formerly known as RAF Wattisham) in Suffolk was witnessed conducting exercises, including ground refuelling on the airfield. During the week commencing 3 March 2025 aircraft tracking sites evidenced ZM416, an Airbus A400M Atlas, doing circuits at the base.

During the mid-1990s the entire technical and domestic site was sold to Roger Byron-Collins' Welbeck Estate Group by Defence Estates. The domestic married quarters site included a number of single storey 'tobacco houses'. The housing estate was renamed Wicken Green Village and, after refurbishment, the houses were sold on the open market. The remaining technical site including barrack blocks, post exchange (PX), church, guardroom, gymnasium, community centres, and extensive storage and industrial units were sold, and are now known as Tattersett Business Park.

The only military buildings on the airfield that had remained were the control tower, the fire station (next to the control tower) and a small half-moon concrete shelter, now used by a farmer for machinery and equipment storage. As of week commencing 21 February 2022, demolition of the control tower had begun. The fire station is to be retained, for USAF use.

=== Heritage centre ===
RAF Sculthorpe Heritage Centre opened in a room at Green Park Rural Centre, Wicken Green Village, in August 2019. It features many Sculthorpe-related items and has parts of a Douglas RB-66 Destroyer including its Allison J71 jet engine, which is the only known surviving example in the country. Queen Elizabeth II made a private visit to the centre and met the curator and volunteers in February 2022.

The Heritage Centre moved into its new home in the former Chapel building at the beginning of 2024 after 18 months of refurbishment.

The display are bespoke to the history Sculthorpe including the UKs only B-29 wreckage on public display.

On the 1st of April, 2026, the RAF Sculthorpe Heritage Centre relocated the former RAF Alconbury F-5 gate guard to the Heritage Centre grounds.

== See also ==
- List of Royal Air Force stations
- United States Air Forces in Europe
- United States Air Force in the United Kingdom
- Strategic Air Command in the United Kingdom
