= No. 100 Group RAF =

Former Royal Air Force operations group

- Active: 1943–1945
- Country: United Kingdom
- Branch: Royal Air Force
- Role: Electronic countermeasures
- Part of: RAF Bomber Command
- Mottos: Confound and Destroy
- Royal Air Force Ensign

Commanders
- Notable commanders: Edward Addison

Insignia
- Group badge: The head of Medusa azure/or/sable. (Note: The group specialised in electronic countermeasures, so used the head of Medusa who confounded her enemies.)

Aircraft flown
- Electronic warfare: Boeing B-17 Flying Fortress, Consolidated B-24 Liberator, Handley Page Halifax, Short Stirling, Vickers Wellington
- Fighter: Bristol Beaufighter, de Havilland Mosquito

No. 100 (Bomber Support) Group was a special duties group within RAF Bomber Command. The group was formed on 11 November 1943 to consolidate the increasingly complex business of electronic warfare and countermeasures in one organisation. The group was responsible for the development, operational trial and use of electronic warfare and countermeasures equipment. It was based at RAF stations in East Anglia, chiefly Norfolk.

The group was a pioneer in countering the formidable force of radar-equipped Luftwaffe night fighters, using a range of electronic 'homers' fitted to de Havilland Mosquito fighters which detected night fighter radar and radio emissions and allowed the RAF fighters to home in onto the Axis aircraft and either shoot them down or disrupt their missions against the bomber streams. Other Mosquitoes would patrol around Luftwaffe fighter airfields ready to attack night fighters as they landed.

This constant harassment had a detrimental effect on the morale and confidence of many Luftwaffe crews and indirectly led to a high proportion of aircraft and aircrew wastage from crashes as night fighters hurried in to land to avoid the Mosquito threat (real or imagined).

From 1944–45, the Mosquitos of 100 Group claimed 258 Luftwaffe aircraft shot down for 70 losses. The gradually increasing threat from the RAF fighters also created what the Luftwaffe crews nicknamed Moskito Panik as the night fighter crews were never sure when or where they may come under attack from the marauding 100 Group fighters.

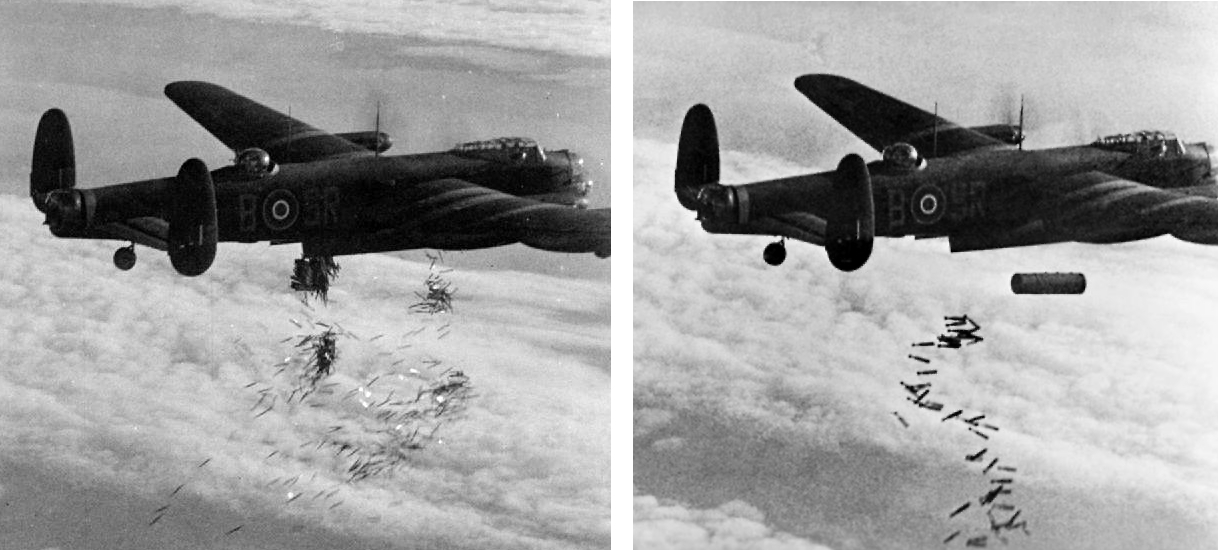
A 101 Squadron Avro Lancaster with Airborne Cigar (ABC) radio jamming equipment - the two vertical aerials on the fuselage, Duisberg 1944

Top Mosquito ace with 100 Group was Wing Commander Branse Burbridge of 85 Squadron, with 21 claims from 1944–45.

The bomber squadrons of 100 Group utilised various specialist electronic jamming devices to disrupt German radio communications and radar. During 100 Group's existence over 32 different devices were evaluated and used. Specially equipped 100 Group aircraft would fly in the bomber stream. Much of this equipment was developed at the Telecommunications Research Establishment (TRE).

Special equipment used included Airborne Cigar (ABC) jammer, Jostle (jammer), Mandrel (jammer), Airborne Grocer (jammer), Piperack (jammer), Perfectos (homer), Serrate (homer), Corona (spoofer), Carpet (jammer) and Lucero (homer), used against German equipment such as Lichtenstein, Freya, and Wurzburg radars.

The combination of the Pathfinders' operations, the activities of No. 100 Group, the British advantage in radar, jamming and Window techniques, combined with intelligent attacking tactics, as well as the discipline and bravery of the RAF crews, have been remarkable. We had our (sic) severe problems in trying to defend Germany in the air

— General der Jagdflieger, Adolf Galland., Lancaster - the Biography

== History ==
100 Group was formed in November 1943 under Air Commodore Addison at Radlett. Its first unit was 192 Squadron whose aircraft had been used for monitoring German radio traffic as part of Y service. The Squadron moved to RAF Foulsham in Norfolk on 7 December. The Group HQ was initially at West Raynham, Norfolk. and then made its permanent headquarters at Bylaugh Hall - about five miles from East Dereham - from January 1944, a central location from which to administer the group's airfields in north Norfolk.

The first operation was in support of Bomber Command raid on Berlin with four intruder aircraft (two Beaufighters and two Mosquitos) of 141 Squadron on 16/17 December. The first success was a Junkers Ju 88 shot down on 23/24 December by a Beaufighter. The squadrons Mosquitos were old aircraft in poor condition and their Beaufighters were being transferred out. With 239 and 169 squadrons still in training, 100 Group could only provide a couple of aircraft, if any, for Bomber Command's attacks on Berlin. Problems with the Mosquitos persisted even when all three squadrons were operational in late January.

The group disbanded on 17 December 1945. During its existence it had one commander, Air Vice-Marshal Edward Addison.

== Order of battle ==
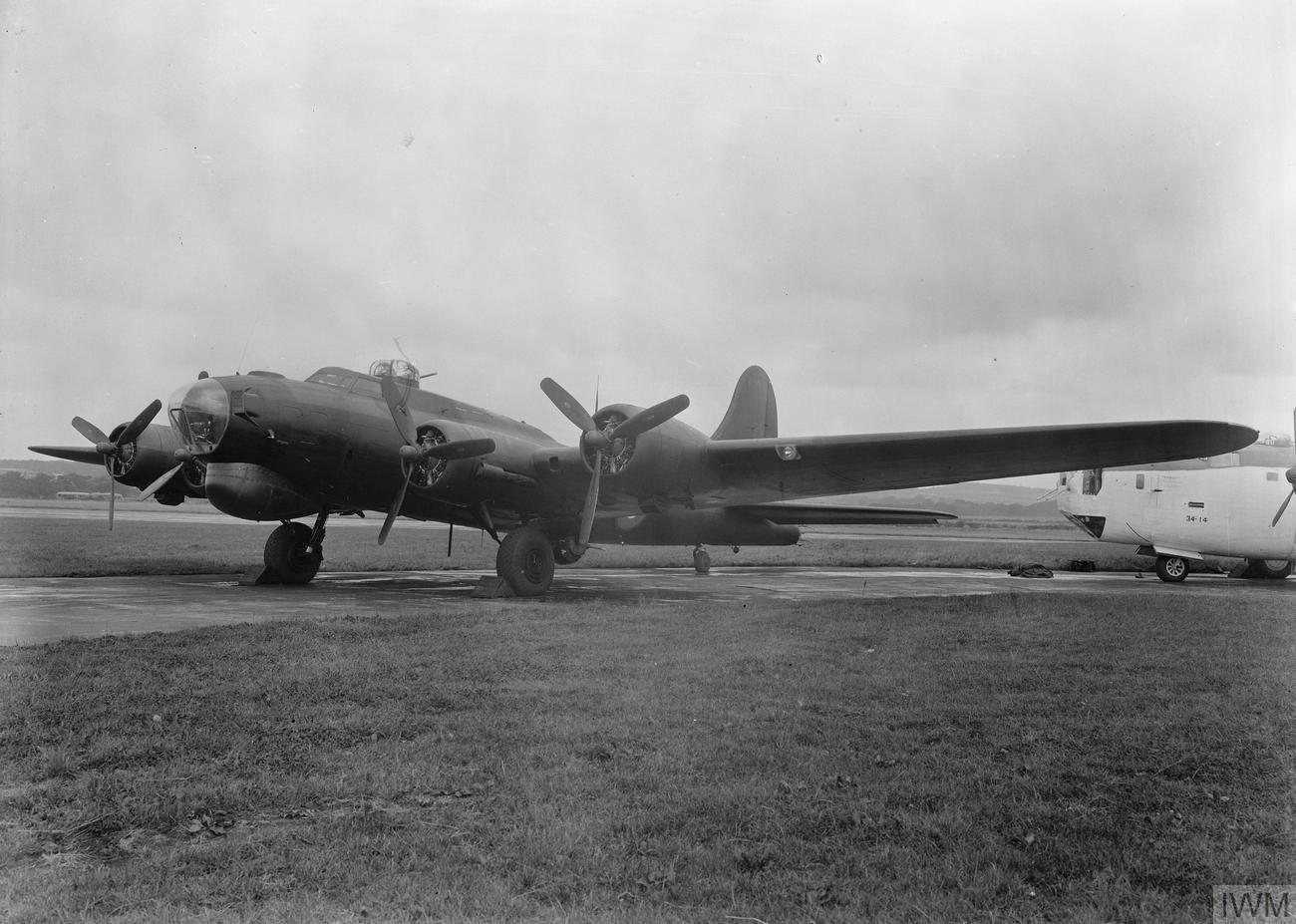
An electronic warfare Fortress III of 214 Squadron with nose-mounted H2S navigation radar

No 100 Group operated from eight airfields with approximately 260 aircraft, 140 of which were various marks of de Havilland Mosquito night fighter intruders with the remainder consisting of Handley Page Halifaxes, Short Stirlings, Vickers Wellingtons, Boeing B-17 Flying Fortress and Consolidated B-24 Liberators carrying electronic jamming equipment. The group also operated the Bristol Beaufighter for a short time.

Intruder aircraft were fitted with Mark IV Airborne Interception radar for locating and attacking enemy fighters and Serrate radar detector to find enemy aircraft using their own Lichtenstein radar to look for Allied aircraft. Intruders would loiter near enemy airfields or staging beacons.

The Short Stirlings were fitted with Mandrel which jammed German Freya (early warning) radars. Later B-17 Flying Fortresses equipped the Carpet to jam Würzburg (gun directing) radars.

No 223 Squadron's Liberators were ex-American Eight Air Force B-24 H and J models, already well used but long ranged and each able to carry multiple 'Jostle' radio telephony jamming units. The Jostle transmitter took the place of the ventral ball turret.

100 (Special Duties) Group order of battle
Squadron	Aircraft	First 100 Group operation	Base
192	de Havilland Mosquito NF.II, B.IV, B.XVI, Vickers Wellington B.III, Handley Page Halifax IV	December 1943	RAF Foulsham
141	Bristol Beaufighter VI, Mosquito II, VI, XXX	December 1943	RAF West Raynham
239	Mosquito II, VI, XXX	20 January 1944	RAF West Raynham
515	Mosquito II, VI	3 March 1944	RAF Little Snoring, RAF Great Massingham
169	Mosquito II, VI, XIX	20 January 1944	RAF Little Snoring
214	Boeing Fortress II, III	20/21 April 1944	RAF Sculthorpe, RAF Oulton
199	Short Stirling B.III, Halifax B.III	1 May 1944	RAF North Creake
157	Mosquito XIX, XXX	May 1944	RAF Swannington
85	Mosquito XII, XVII	5/6 June 1944	RAF Swannington
23	Mosquito VI	5/6 July 1944	RAF Little Snoring
223	Consolidated Liberator VI, Fortress II, III	September 1944	RAF Oulton
171	Stirling II, Halifax III	15 September 1944	RAF North Creake
462 (RAAF)	Halifax III	13 March 1945	RAF Foulsham

Other units and stations:

- No. 1692 Flight RAF based at RAF Little Snoring
- No. 1699 Flight RAF based at RAF Oulton to train Fortress crews for 214 Squadron
- No. 100 Group Communications Flight at RAF West Raynham and then RAF Swanton Morley
- No. 80 (Signals) Wing RAF from November 1943 based at Radlett Aerodrome, controlled Meacon beacons and other radio countermeasures and intelligence work.

== See also ==
- Light Night Strike Force
- List of World War II electronic warfare equipment
- List of Royal Air Force groups
- 36th Bombardment Squadron
- Michael Renaut
