= No. 199 Squadron RAF =

Defunct flying squadron of the Royal Air Force

- Active: 1917-1919; 1942-1945; 1951-1958
- Country: United Kingdom
- Branch: Royal Air Force
- Motto: "Let tyrants tremble"

No. 199 Squadron was a Royal Air Force aircraft squadron that operated as a training unit in WWI, as a bomber and radio countermeasures unit during the Second World War, and later in the 1950s again as a radio countermeasures squadron.

== History ==
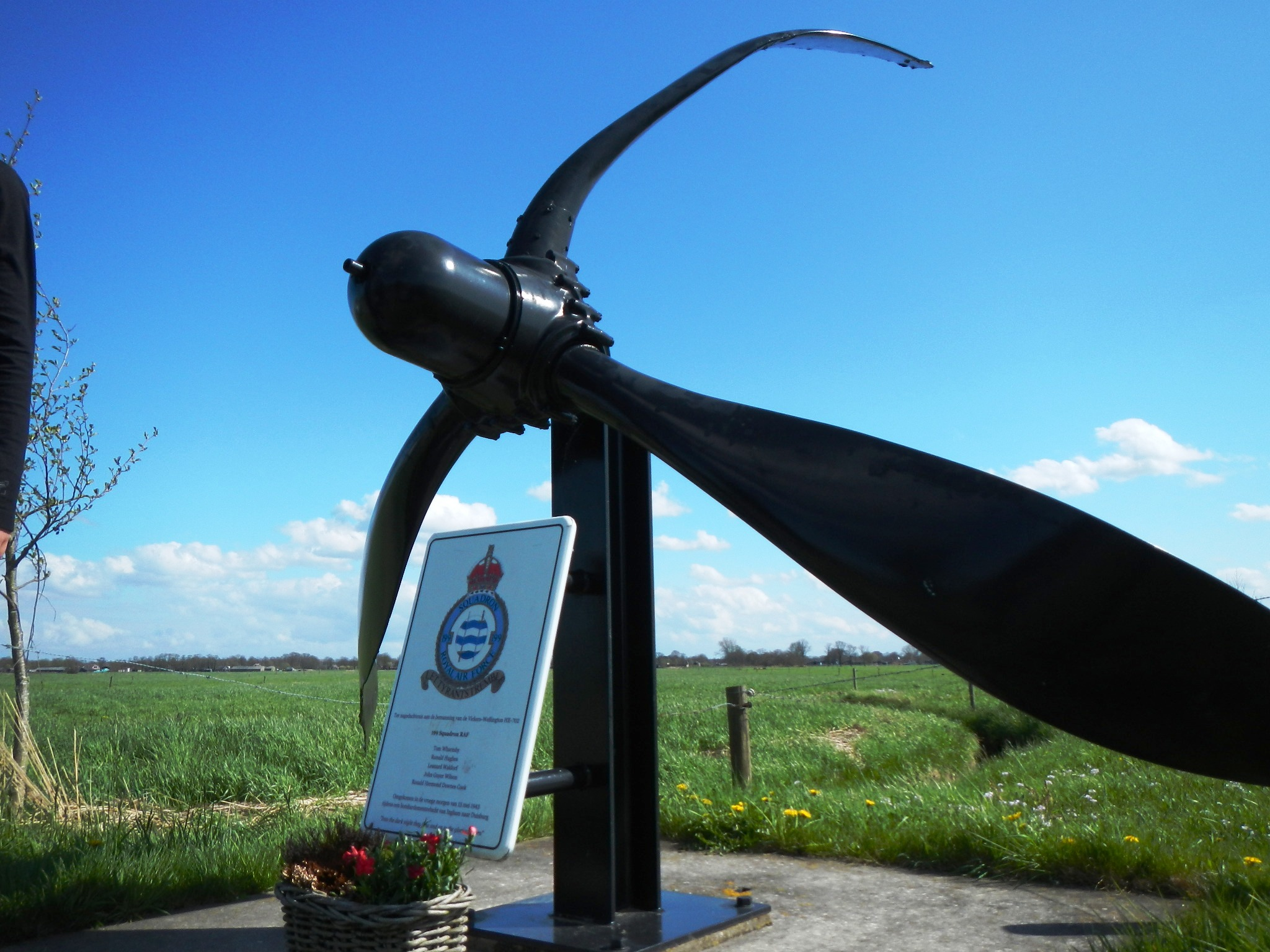
Dutch monument to Wellington HE702, lost over Doornspijk, Netherlands, on 13 May 1943

The squadron reformed at RAF Blyton on 7 November 1942 equipped with the Vickers Wellington, after a few months the squadron moved to RAF Lakenheath and was re-equipped with the Short Stirling heavy-bomber. Between February 1943 and June 1943 the squadron was based at RAF Ingham in Lincolnshire training for maritime mine laying over The Wash. Following training the squadron returned to RAF Lakenheath for marine operations over the English Channel and North Sea.

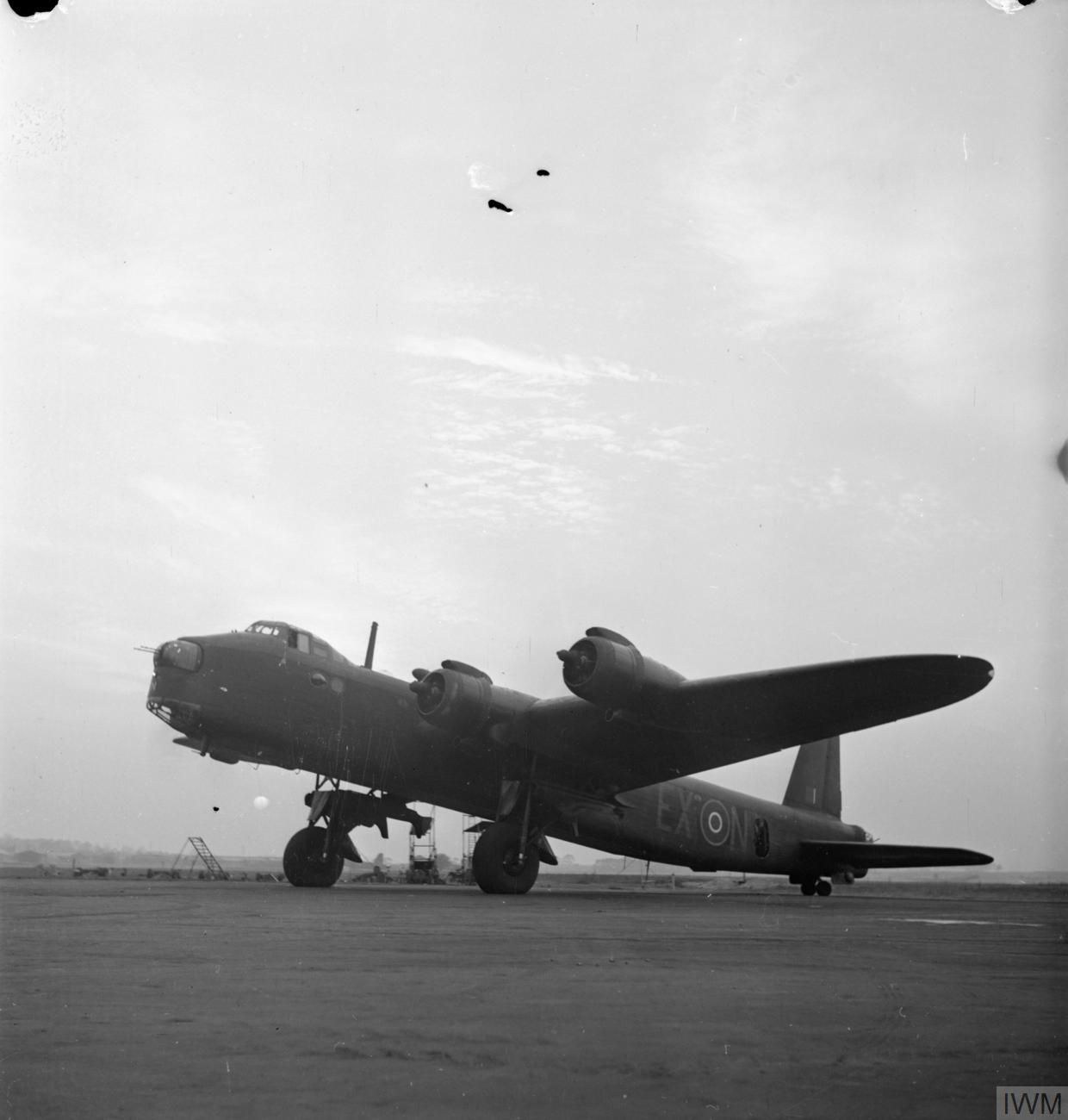
Stirling at Lakenheath, preparing for a minelaying operation along the Dutch coast

In July 1943 the squadron commenced mine laying duties using the Stirling and from February 1944 performed supply drops for the Special Operations Executive.

In May 1944 the squadron was moved from 3 Group to No. 100 (Radio Countermeasures) Group and from RAF Lakenheath to RAF North Creake. It was equipped with new Short Stirling IIIs fitted with Mandrel and Shiver radar jamming equipment and the Gee navigation aid to perform radar jamming operations during the landings in Normandy. While Mandrel had already been used with Bomber Command's 'Main Force' on heavy bomber raids over Germany and by 515 Squadron, 199 Squadron were to create a solid screen of jamming for the main force. This entailed pairs of aircraft flying circuits about 10 miles long perpendicular to the enemy coast; the two aircraft covering the full spectrum of the enemy radar between them. In 1945 the Stirlings were exchanged for the Handley Page Halifax until the squadron was disbanded on 29 July 1945 at RAF North Creake. Over the months, the squadron refined their technique and with two other squadrons could form a screen from Sussex north east and out over the North Sea about level with the Humber. C Flight was split off from 199 to form 171 Squadron, eventually receiving Halifax bombers with Mandrel.

In 1951 the squadron was formed again at RAF Watton as part of No. 90 Signals Group to operate in the electronic countermeasures role with the Avro Lincoln and de Havilland Mosquito. The Mosquitos were replaced by the English Electric Canberra and the squadron operated with other pathfinder Canberra squadrons at RAF Hemswell. The Lincolns were replaced by the Vickers Valiant in 1957. The squadron was disbanded on 15 December 1958 with the Valiants of C Flight becoming 18 Squadron at RAF Finningley.

== Aircraft operated ==
Dates	Aircraft	Variant
1917–1919	Royal Aircraft Factory B.E.2	BE.2e
1942–1943	Vickers Wellington	III and X
1943–1945	Short Stirling	III, and a few converted IV
1945	Handley Page Halifax	III
1951–1957	Avro Lincoln	B2
1952–1953	de Havilland Mosquito	NF36
1954–1958	English Electric Canberra	B2
1957–1958	Vickers Valiant	B1
