= RAF West Raynham =

Former Royal Air Force station in Norfolk, England

RAF West Raynham
- Fakenham, Norfolk in England
- Station badge

Site information
- Type: Royal Air Force station
- Code: WR
- Owner: Ministry of Defence
- Operator: Royal Air Force
- Controlled by: RAF Bomber Command * No. 2 Group RAF * No. 6 (T) Group RAF * No. 100 (BS) Group RAF; RAF Fighter Command; RAF Strike Command

Location
- Shown within Norfolk
- Coordinates: 52°47′21″N 000°44′08″E
- Grid reference: TF850245

Site history
- Built: 1938/39
- Built by: Allot Ltd
- In use: May 1939 – 1994
- Battles/wars: European theatre of World War II; Cold War

Airfield information
- Elevation: 80 metres (262 ft) AMSL
Runways
Direction	Length and surface
02/20	1,765 metres (5,791 ft) Concrete
08/26	1,325 metres (4,347 ft) Concrete

Royal Air Force West Raynham, or more simply RAF West Raynham, is a former Royal Air Force station located 2 miles (3.2 km) west of West Raynham, Norfolk and 5.5 miles (8.9 km) southwest of Fakenham, Norfolk, England.

The airfield opened during May 1939 and was used by RAF Bomber Command during the Second World War with the loss of 86 aircraft.

The station closed in 1994, though the Ministry of Defence (MoD) retained it as a strategic reserve. Having lain derelict since closure, the station was deemed surplus to requirements by the MoD in 2004 and two years later was sold to the Welbeck Estate Group who resold the entire site in October 2007. It is now managed by FW Properties of Norwich, acting for administrators Moore Stephens. The technical area now operates as a business park with many buildings now reused. The former married quarter areas are now all occupied with a pub and nursery on site.

Planning permission was granted for the installation of a 49.9 MW solar farm, together with plant housing and a perimeter fence, operated by Good Energy. The solar farm is now fully operational.

== History ==
=== Second World War ===
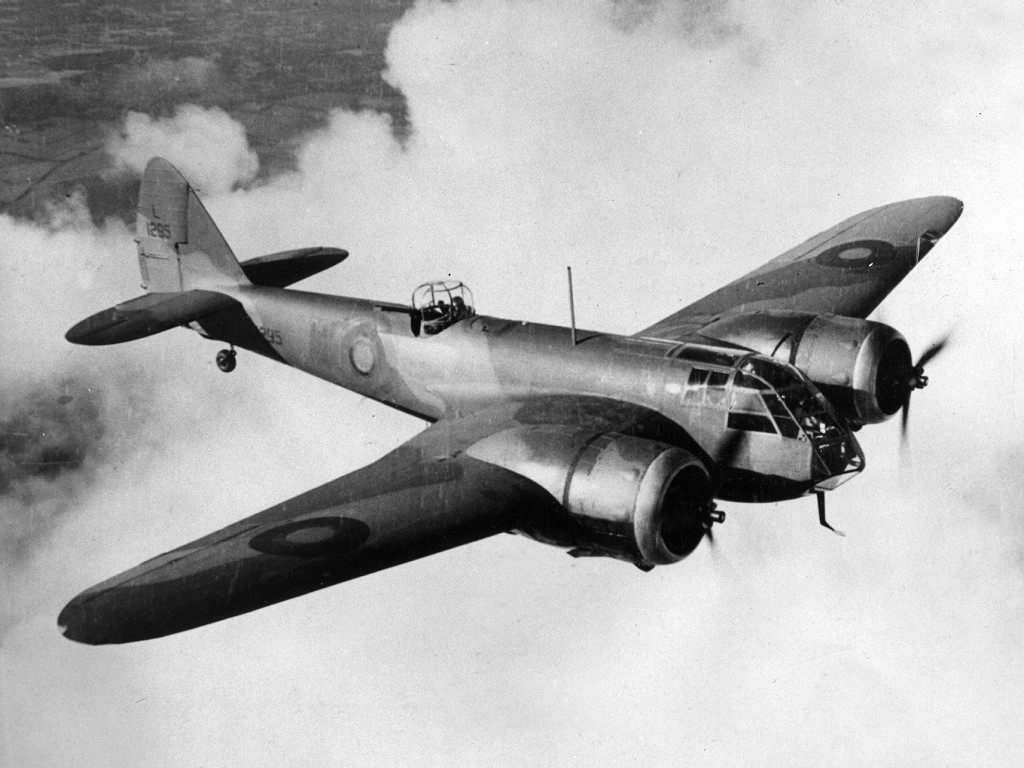
Bristol Blenheims were used by squadrons 101 and 114, both based at RAF West Raynham during the Second World War.

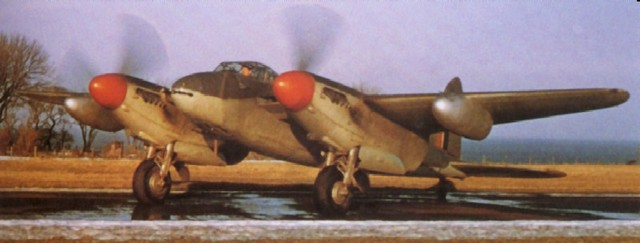
Two squadrons of de Havilland Mosquito night fighters were based at RAF West Raynham from 1943.

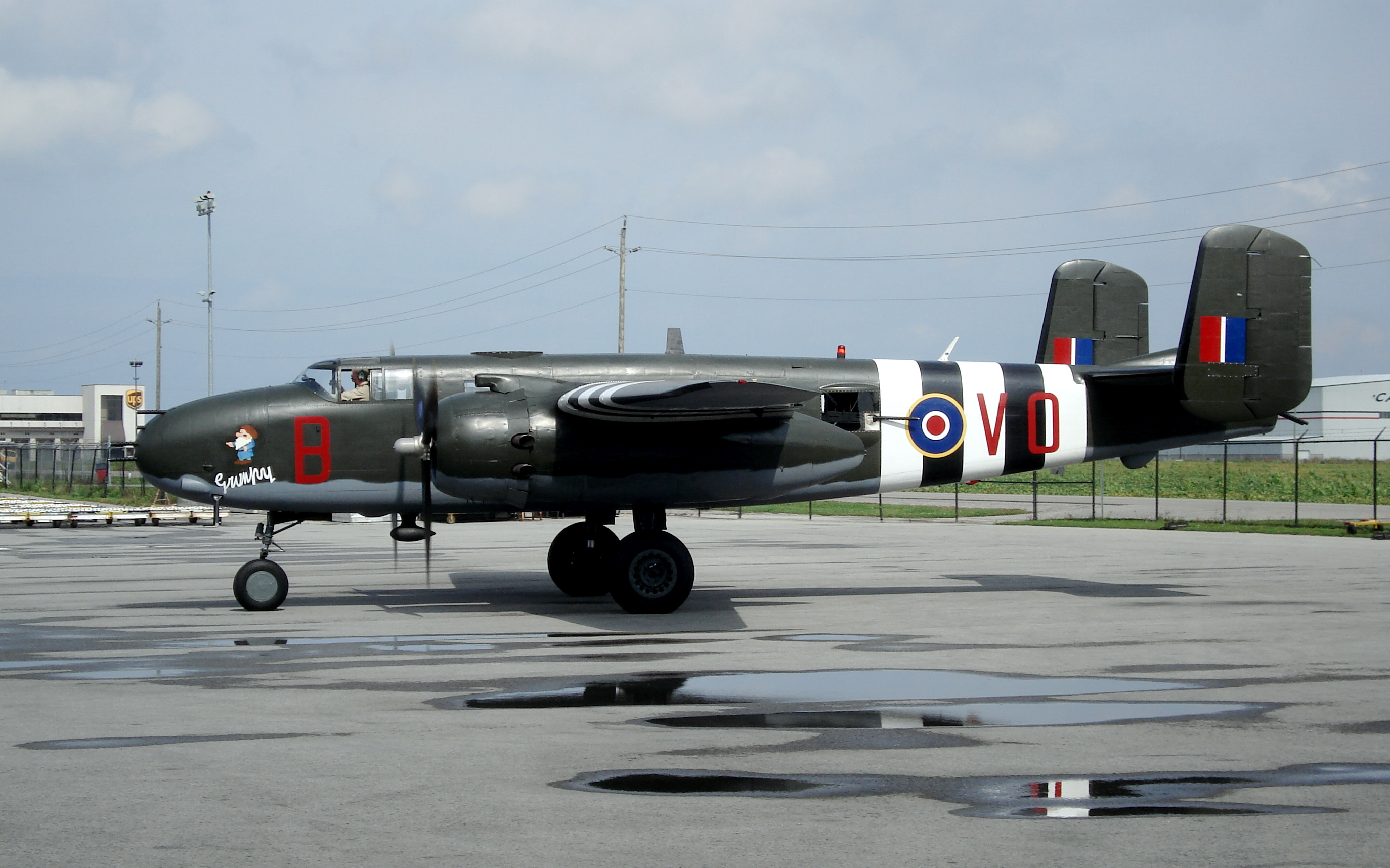
B-25J in 98 RAF Squadron markings

Built between 1938 and 1939, RAF West Raynham was an expansion scheme airfield. The grass landing area was aligned roughly north-east to south-west. The main camp, with housing and headquarters, was located immediately west of the landing area. To the south-east were bomb stores. The airfield was originally equipped with a Watch Office with Tower (Fort Type), of pattern 207/36 (made from concrete), although the original control room was later removed and new larger control room built to pattern 4698/43. The newer VHB type control tower was a post war addition.

101 Squadron – a detachment of Bristol Blenheim which was part of 2 Group – were moved to West Raynham in May 1939. The only squadron based at RAF West Raynham, 101 Squadron were held in reserve by 2 Group until they were used as target tugs in February 1940. In 1940, RAF West Raynham also acted as a temporary base for 18 and 139 squadrons after they suffered losses in the Blitzkrieg.

RAF Great Massingham was founded in 1940, just 2 miles (3.2 km) from RAF West Raynham to act as a satellite base. It was originally intended to support West Raynham and provide it with extra space for its Blenheims, but eventually expanded to accommodate a squadron of its own. A second support airfield, RAF Sculthorpe, was built to the north.

On 4 July 1940, 101 Squadron saw action for the first time. Individual aircraft attacked oil tanks in German ports. This went on for over a year, and during this time the squadron lost 15 Blenheims across 610 missions. No. 101 Squadron was transferred to 3 Group and consequently left West Raynham. They were replaced at West Raynham by 114 Squadron, another detachment of Blenheims. They were stationed at West Rayham for over a year before they were despatched to North Africa as part of "Operation Torch". The squadron converted to Blenheim Mk Vs in August 1942, in preparation for combat in Africa. No. 18 Squadron also went to RAF West Raynham to be refitted with Mk Vs. At this time, squadrons 180 and 342 were formed at West Raynham. 180 Squadron was equipped with North American B-25 Mitchells and based at RAF Great Massingham which was associated with RAF West Raynham. 342 Squadron was provided with Douglas Bostons crewed by Frenchmen in early 1943, and was later relocated to RAF Sculthorpe.

Between May and November 1943, the grass landing area was replaced with two concrete runways, one 04-22 and 2,000 yards (1,800 m) long and the other 10–28 1,400 yards (1,300 m). At the same time, the existing housing on the site was expanded to provide accommodation for 2,456 men and 658 women.

In December 1943, the station was taken over by 100 Group, who brought 141 and 239 squadrons to RAF West Raynham. They were equipped with de Havilland Mosquito, fighter aircraft which provided support to bomber sorties in enemy air space. They were based at West Raynham until the end of the war; their duties involved flying Serrate patrols and "Ranger sorties" (seek and destroy enemy fighters in the air and on the ground). During the war, squadrons stationed at RAF West Raynham lost 56 Blenheims, 29 Mosquitos, and a Bristol Beaufighter.

=== Postwar ===
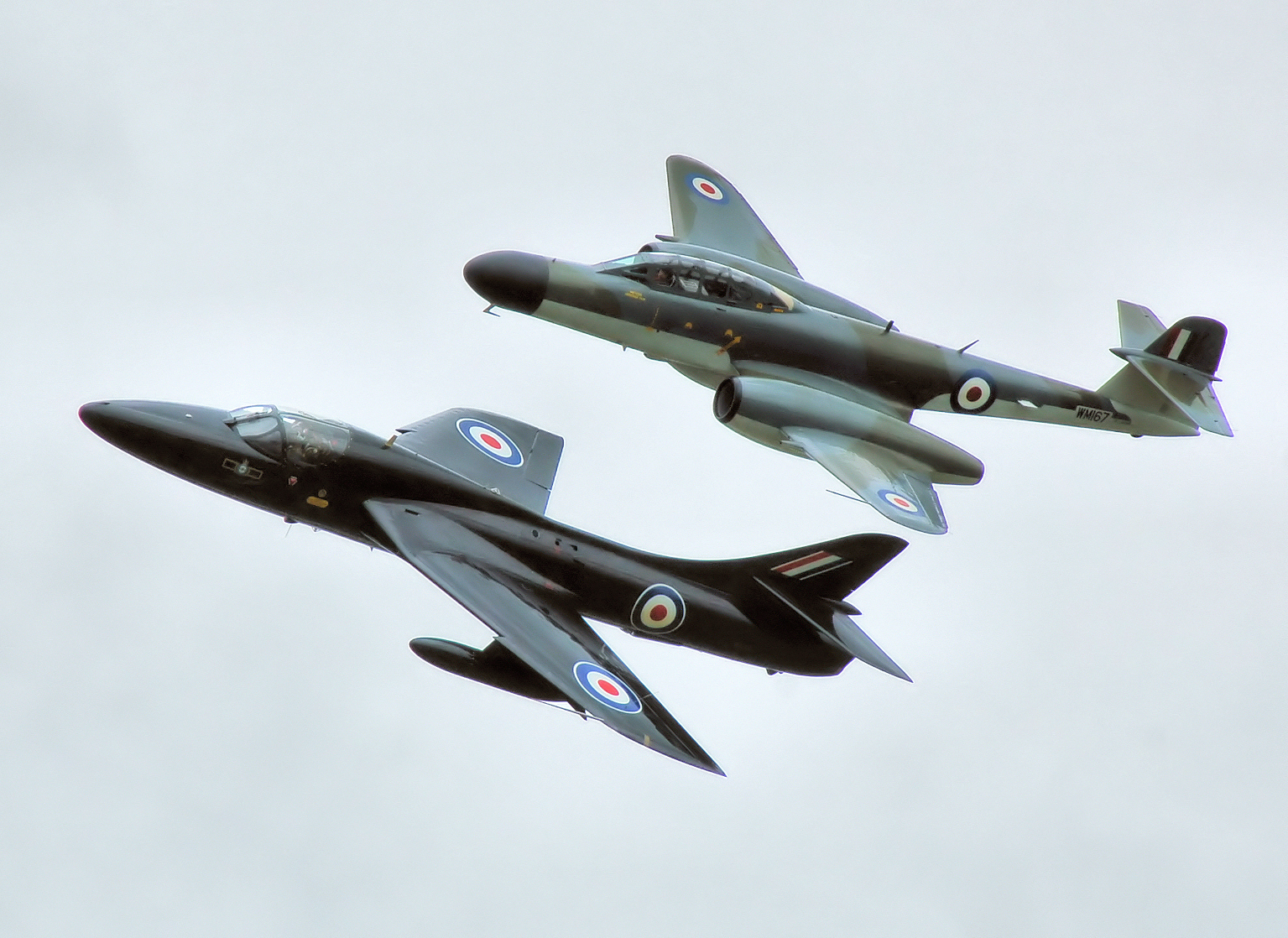
Hawker Hunter and Gloster Meteor. Two aircraft types that saw post-WW2 operation from West Raynham.

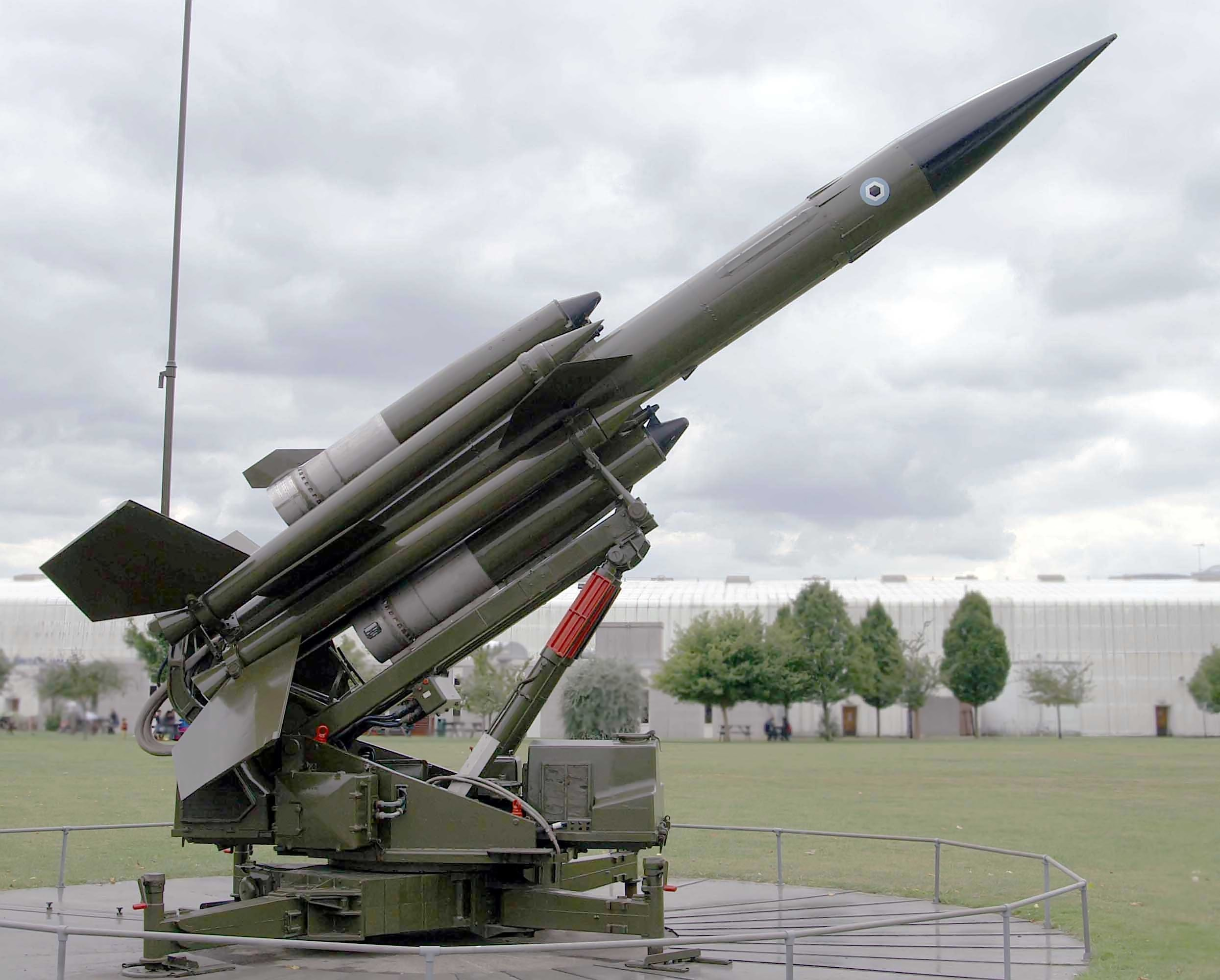
Bristol Bloodhound surface-to-air missile at the Royal Air Force Museum London, Hendon, formerly of No.85 Squadron

From 1945 to 1962, RAF West Raynham was Central Fighter Establishment of the Royal Air Force. In 1946, the station underwent improvements, including new range facilities at Setchey, North Wooton and Holbeach, extra Officers accommodation, new technical facilities, a new cinema at Great Massingham and finally, provision of a new Flying Control and Crash Rescue Building for Very Heavy Bomber Stations to a drawing number 294/45. This was opened on 20 May 1948 following problems with the VCR glazing.

The station still had at least two operational Gloster Meteor jet fighters, a squadron of twin tail-boomed de Havilland Venoms and de Havilland Vampire trainer jets. The very latest arrival in 1957 was a flight of Gloster Javelins, which also appeared at the Farnborough Airshow the same year.

The 1956 Hawker Hunter multiple aircraft accident happened on the morning of Wednesday 8 February 1956. Eight Hawker Hunter aircraft from the Central Fighter Establishment took off on an exercise. The weather closed in, causing them to be diverted to RAF Marham. Two aircraft landed safely, a third ran off the runway, and the fourth crashed into a field killing the pilot. The remaining four pilots ejected, with the aircraft crashing in open country. This incident was raised in the House of Commons.

In 1964 a tripartite squadron, comprising members of the British, American and German armed forces, was formed at West Raynham to evaluate the Hawker P.1127 Vertical Take-Off and Landing (VTOL) strike fighter aircraft.

In 1964, the East side of the airfield was developed as a SAM site, equipped with the Bristol Bloodhound Mk2 and its associated radars. The resident unit was No. 41 Squadron RAF. Some of the radars, launch control units, and launchers were air portable for deployment elsewhere if required.

Between 28 and 31 March 1967 Hawker Hunters from West Raynham were involved in Operation Mop Up. This operation saw repeated attacks by Hunters from Raynham and RAF Chivenor, along with aircraft of the Fleet Air Arm, dropping aviation fuel and napalm on an oil slick being released from the wreck of the supertanker Torrey Canyon which had run aground on Seven Stones reef, near Lands End. On 9 June 1967 a Handley Page Hastings C2, registration WD491, was written off at Raynham when a tyre burst during landing.

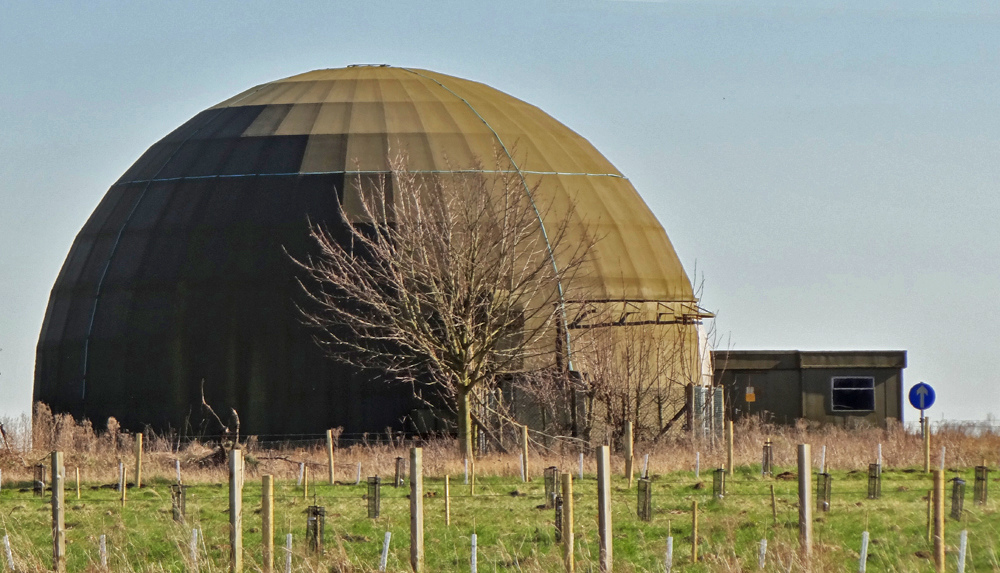
The former Rapier missile training dome at RAF West Raynham

In 1968 a Hunter from RAF West Raynham was used by Flight Lieutenant Alan Pollock, a flight commander in No. 1 Squadron RAF, to unofficially mark the 50th Anniversary of the Royal Air Force. This event is commonly referred to as the Hawker Hunter Tower Bridge incident.

On 19 December 1975, 85 Squadron, which had been stationed at the base flying the Gloster Javelin and Gloster Meteor in the early 1960s, made their headquarters at West Raynham after being reformed as a Bristol Bloodhound Mark II surface-to-air missile unit. 85 Squadron remained at West Raynham until it was disbanded on 10 July 1991, with the Standard bearing the squadrons battle honours placed in the safe keeping of Ely Cathedral.

In 1963, 1971, 1980, 1981 and 1982, RAF West Raynham was the location of the Royal Observer Corps annual summer training camps for eight weeks when up to 500 observers attended each week for technical training sessions. Other ranks were accommodated in spare barrack blocks and officers in the officers' mess. In 1980 the start of the camps coincided with a no notice station three-day Tactical Evaluation (TACEVAL) inspection by RAF Strike Command and much consternation was caused when a full-time ROC officer arrived at the main gate in a car loaded with radioactive sources needed for an ROC training session. With the arrival obviously not expected by the TACEVAL directing staff the vehicle was placed under armed guard and the ROC officer bundled into the station guardroom where he remained locked up for several hours until the senior ROC officer was located to vouch for him.

=== Closure and redevelopment ===
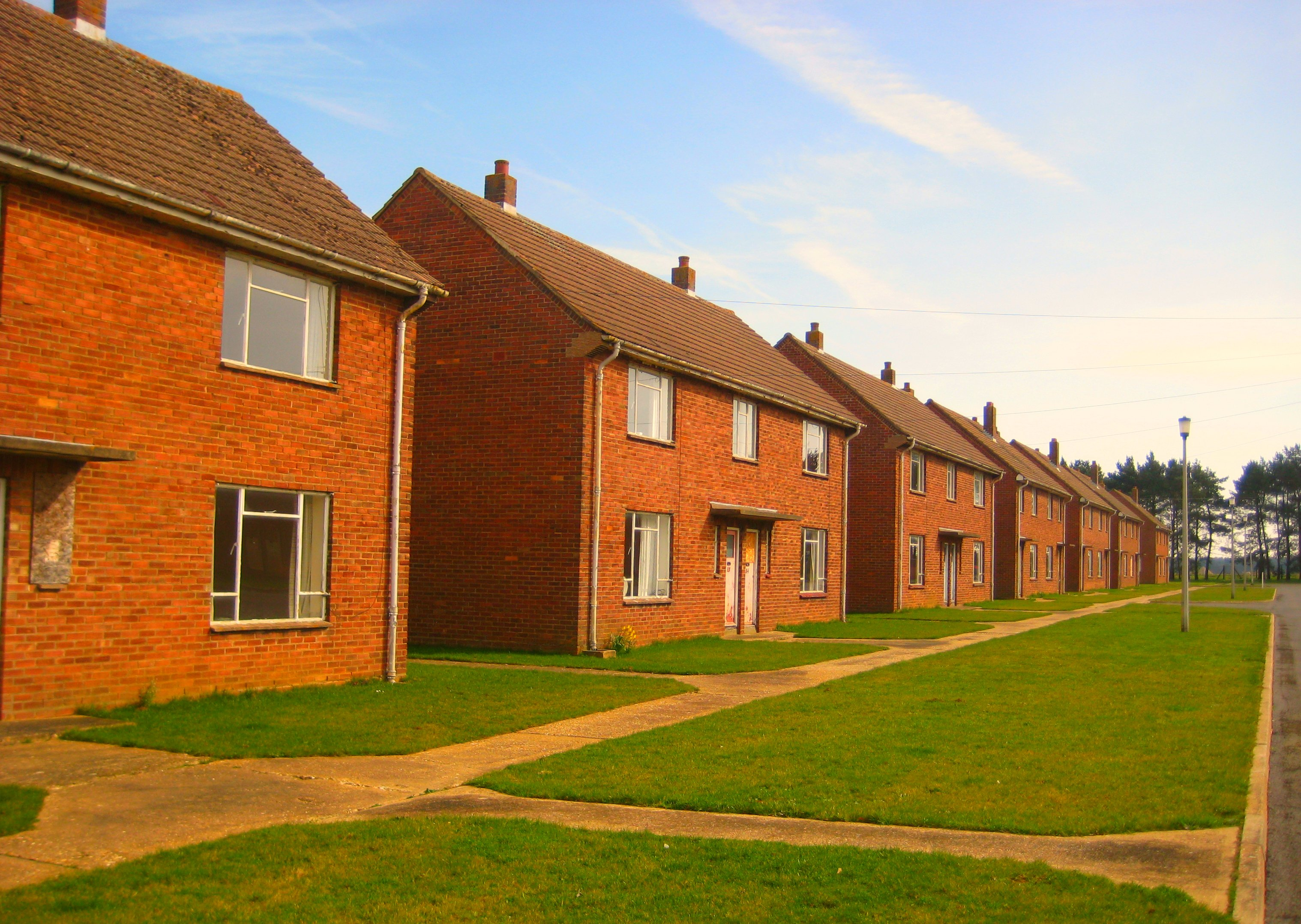
Former Airmen's Married Quarters at RAF West Raynham

In 1994, RAF West Raynham was shut down by the Ministry of Defence. The airfield and technical site remained the property of the MoD but the site was disused and its houses left empty and falling into disrepair. In 2002 Norman Lamb, Member of Parliament for North Norfolk, labelled the situation a "scandal" as at the time there was a shortage of affordable housing in the region. Though empty, the MoD had retained RAF West Raynham as a strategic reserve, however in 2004 it was decided that the base would play no future role in the defence of the country. Lamb campaigned for the houses to be turned over for civilian use, and it was announced in October 2004 that 170 homes at RAF West Raynham would be sold. In December 2005 it was announced that the whole site would be sold by tender.

The site was purchased from Defence Estates by Roger Byron-Collins' company the Welbeck Estate Group on 7th April 2006, then resold it on 25th July 2008, as they had been unable to install the necessary infrastructure as was standard procedure with their previous MOD acquisitions including nearby RAF Sculthorpe. It was sold to Tamarix Investments; they planned to build new homes on the site and a hotel, as well as renovate the standing houses. The plans included turning the site into an eco-village, with a biomass generator to supply power. The 170 houses at RAF West Raynham will be repaired and 40 more homes added to the site. In 2008, planning permission was granted for the construction of 58 properties and for the conversion of the hangars into twenty loft style holiday apartments.

A Large part of the remaining hard standing and hangars 3 and 4 have been purchased by Norfolk Oak, previously from Anmer Hall.

== Heritage ==
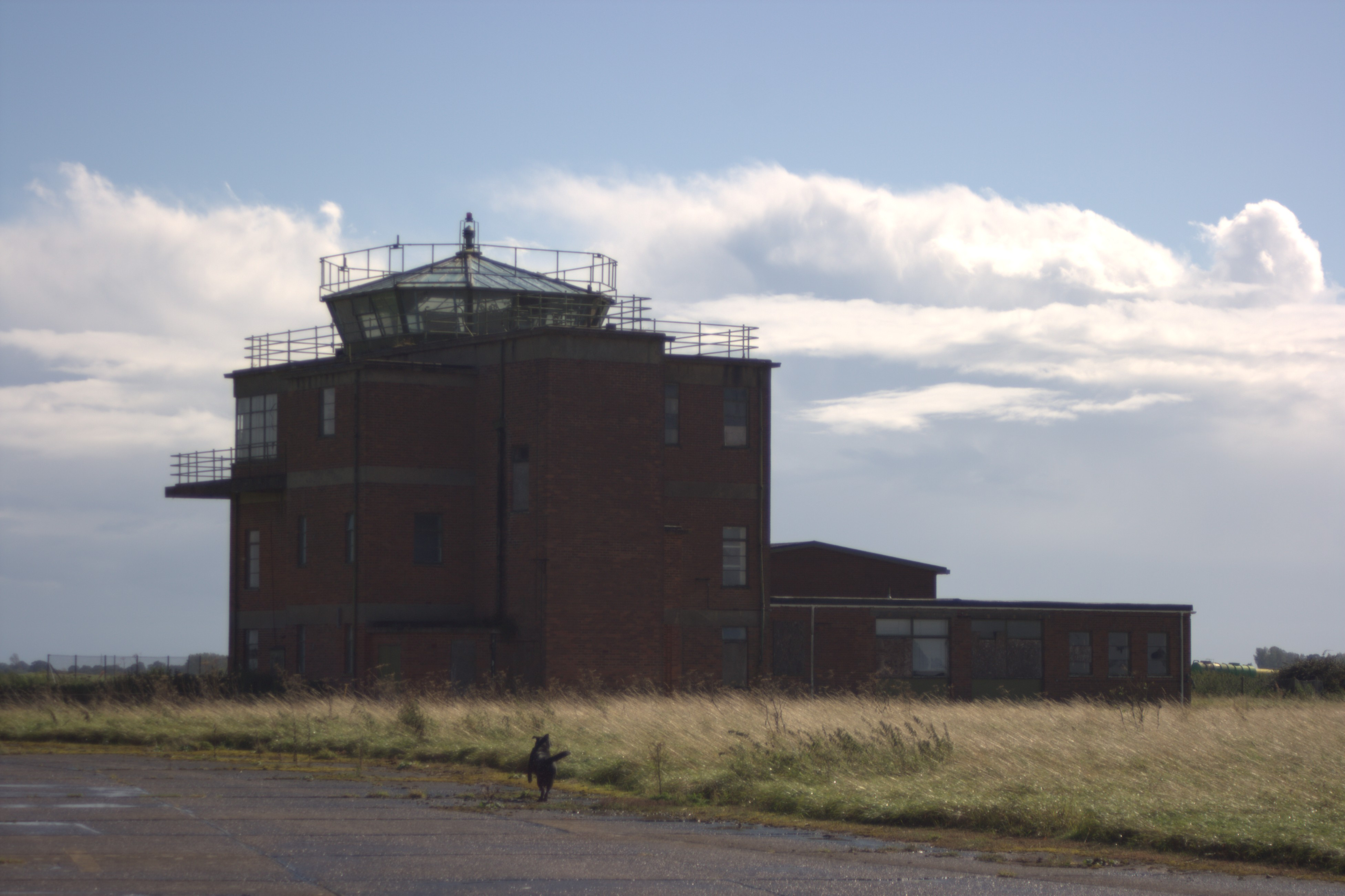
The previously derelict VHB control tower, has recently been sympathetically transformed into a private residence.

A proposal to afford Grade II listed status to the Type C Hangars, Control Tower, Parachute Store, Workshops, Station Sick Quarters & Annex, Station Armoury, Works Dept. and Water Tower, Central Heating Station, Station Headquarters and Operations Block, Guard House, main entrance gates and railings, Officer's Mess, Felbrigg Walk (two NCO married quarters), Nos 3–8 Airmen's Married Quarters, and five blocks of Airmen's Married Quarters under a Thematic Listing Programme was withdrawn by English Heritage.

Following the Grade II Listing of the post-war VHB Control Tower in June 2021, ten other structures on the former airfield were nationally designated as Grade II Listed buildings in March 2023. These were the original Watch Office (Building 72), all four C-type hangars, Station HQ/Operations Block, Parachute Store, Armoury & blast walls and two Ready Use Pyrotechnic Stores (Buildings 64 & 77). Historic England's descriptions of these designated heritage assets refer to RAF West Raynham as one of the best preserved RAF expansion scheme bomber bases.

Gloster Meteor F.8, number WK654, is preserved at the City of Norwich Aviation Museum. This aircraft served with the ‘All Weather Flying Squadron’ and Central Fighter Establishment at RAF West Raynham. Gloster Javelin FAW8 XH992 has been preserved in 85 Squadron markings at the Newark Air Museum. The Bloodhound missile that formerly served as gate guardian outside the station HQ is preserved at RAF Cosford.

On 13 May 2008 Air Commodore Clive Bairsto presented Wing Commander Seb Kendall of No 6 RAF Force Protection Wing HQ with its recently approved badge. This badge includes the sword from the badge of RAF West Raynham, the former home of 6 Wing RAF Regiment.

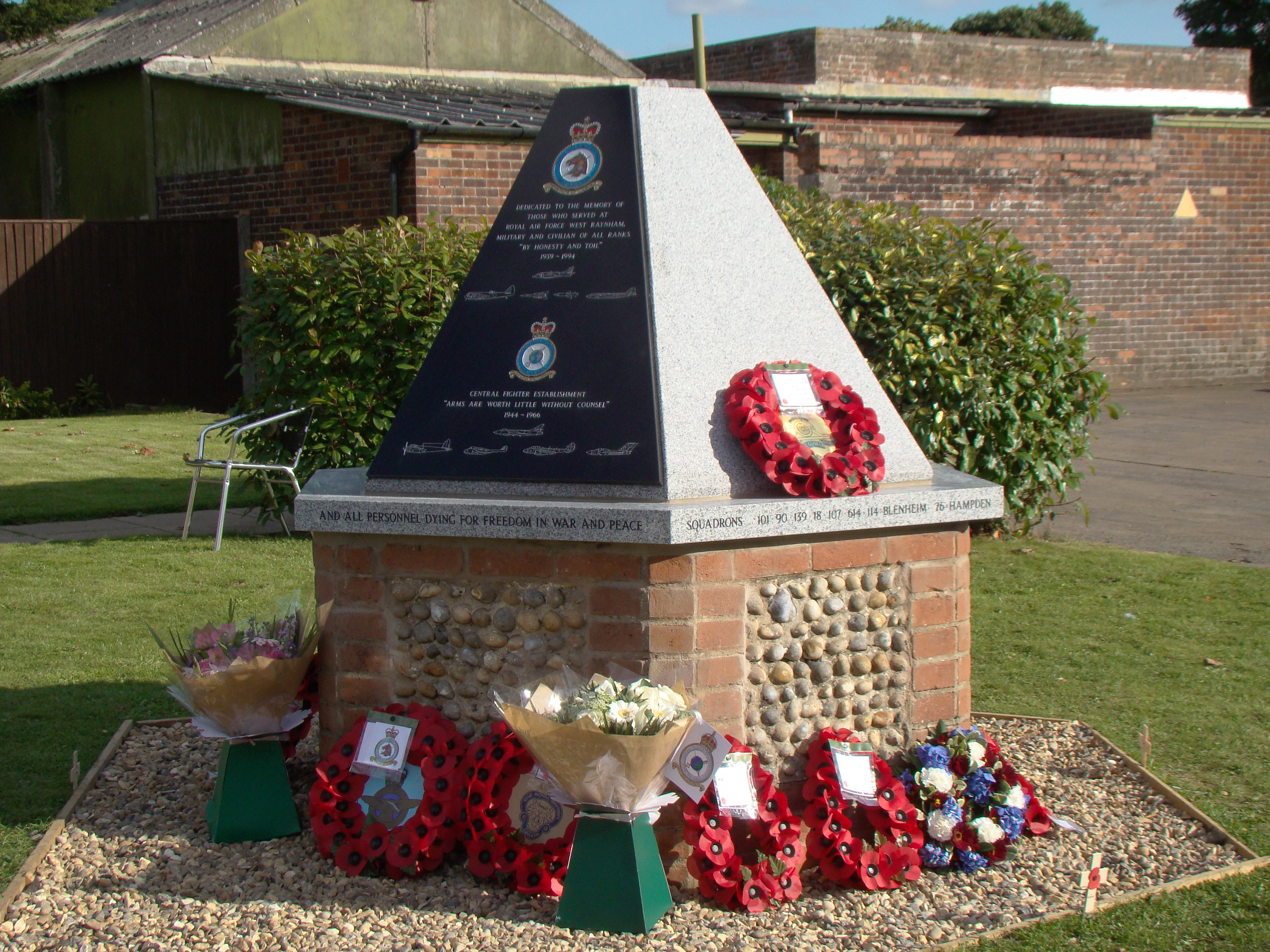
Completed Memorial

Funds were raised to erect a permanent memorial to all who served at RAF West Raynham between 1939 and 1994. It depicts the station badge and the badge of the Central Fighter Establishment (1944–1966) It was sited on an existing plinth which once held a Norfolk village type sign of the station badge. This plinth was donated by Investec, the site owners and repaired by FW Properties of Norwich, who manage the site.

It also has a representation of aircraft which flew from WR and associated squadrons. The aircraft represented are: the Bristol Blenheim, the first operational aircraft to fly from RAF West Raynham with No 101 Squadron; the Bristol Bloodhound and BAe Dynamics Rapier missiles to represent air defence roles; the English Electric Canberra, the last operational aircraft to fly from RAF West Raynham. Finally, the Hawker Siddeley Kestrel, later developed as the famous Harrier jump-jet, was evaluated at WR in 1965, with a Tri-partite Squadron consisting of military test pilots from Great Britain, the United States and West Germany. One of the Kestrels (XS695) can be viewed at the RAFM Cosford.

The aircraft which flew with the Central Fighter Establishment and RAF West Raynham are represented by the de Havilland Mosquito; the de Havilland Vampire; the Gloster Meteor; the Hawker Hunter and the Gloster Javelin. In addition, Fleet Air Arm Squadrons 746 and 787 served alongside CFE. Between them they flew over 35 types of aircraft.

The Memorial was unveiled by Air Vice Marshal Les Phipps, Wing Commander Don Webb DFM and Mr Kenny Freeman on 27 September 2014.

== Television and film ==
Following closure RAF West Raynham was used as the location venue for the two part miniseries, Over Here. The series was filmed at the station in 1996, starring Martin Clunes and Samuel West.

In 2009, Channel 4 used the former base as a location for a documentary on the contribution of Polish fighter pilots in the Second World War. West Raynham stood in for both RAF Northolt and RAF Uxbridge, with Air Cadets from Watton being employed in the filming.

Between 9–15 January 2010, RAF West Raynham featured on the LivingTV series Most Haunted Live in a series called "The Silent Town". Shooting took place at a variety of locations on the base, including Hangars 3 and 4, the control towers, Guard Room, Station Headquarters, Sergeant's Mess, Officer's Mess, hospital and chapel, employing a crew of 120 people at the closed base. North American Harvard trainer aircraft 1747, from Duxford, was displayed in the Hangar 4 studio set for the duration of the shoot, becoming the first aircraft to officially use the airfield since closure.

The 2023 short film The Shepherd starring John Travolta used the airfield as a setting.

== Units ==
Units based at RAF West Raynham included:

Dates	Squadron	Aircraft	Notes
9 May 1939 – 6 July 1941	101 Sqn	Bristol Blenheim	Part of 2 Group
10 May – 13 August 1939, 27 August 3 September 1939, 11 – 14 September 1939	90 Sqn	Blenheim	Training unit
Oct 1939 – March 1941	No. 2 Group Target Towing Flight		
30 April – 20 May 1940	76 Sqn		Part of 6 Group
30 May – 10 June 1940	139 Sqn	Blenheim	
12 June – 9 September 1940	18 Sqn	Blenheim	
15 May – 28 June 1941	90 Sqn	Boeing Fortress I	
20–21 June 1941	268 Sqn	Curtiss Tomahawk; Lysander	Tactical reconnaissance unit.
19 July – 15 November 1941	No. 1420 Flight		
19 July 1941 – 13 November 1942	114 Sqn	Blenheim IV and V	Part of 2 Group
23 August - 11 November 1942	18 Sqn	Blenheim IV and V	
11 September – 19 October 1942	180 Sqn	North American Mitchell II	
12 September – 15 October 1942	98 Sqn	North American Mitchell II	Part of 2 Group
1 April – 15 May 1943	342 Sqn	Douglas Boston III	Part of 2 Group
1943 – July 1944	2755 Sqn RAF Regiment		Light anti-aircraft unit
3 December 1943 – 18 January 1944	HQ, 100 Group		No. 100 Group pioneered the use of offensive Electronic Warfare.
4 December 1943 – 3 July 1945	141 Sqn	de Havilland Mosquito	Night Intruder operations in support of bombers, part of 100 Group
10 December 1943 – 1 July 1945	239 Sqn	de Havilland Mosquito	Night Intruder operations in support of bombers, part of 100 Group
25 January – 9 February 1944	No. 100 Group Communications Flight		
24 January – 21 May 1944	No. 1694 Flight		
1 October 1945 – 5 October 1962	Central Fighter Establishment	Gloster Meteor F8 de Havilland Vampire de Havilland Venom; Gloster Javelin; Hawker Hunter	Day Fighter Leaders School (1 October 1945 – 15 March 1958); All-Weather Wing (3 July 1950 – February 1956); All-Weather Development Sqn (February 1956 – August 1959); All-Weather Fighter Leaders School (July 1950 – 15 March 1958); All-Weather Fighter Combat School (15 March 1958 – 1 July 1962); Day Fighter Combat School (15 March 1958 – 13 November 1962)
20 May 1950 – 1 December 1952	Fighter Command Instrument Training Flt/Sqn		
9 September 1960 – 31 March 1963	85 Sqn	Gloster Javelin FAW.8	Part of Fighter Command
1 – 25 April 1963	85 Sqn	Gloster Meteor	Squadron reformed through renaming the Target Facilities Squadron at West Raynham
13 August 1963 – 18 July 1969	1 Sqn	Hawker Hunter FGA9	Part of 38 Group
14 August 1963 – 1 September 1969	54 Sqn	Hawker Hunter FGA9	Part of 38 Group
15 October 1964 – 30 November 1965	Kestrel Evaluation Sqn	Hawker Siddeley Kestrel	The tripartite training and evaluation unit for the forerunner to the Hawker-Siddeley Harrier "Jump Jet".
1 September 1965 – 31 July 1970	41 Sqn	Bristol Bloodhound (missile)	defence against Soviet bombers
1 February 1966 – 30 June 1967	Fighter Command Trials Unit		
1 September 1969 – 13 March 1970	"UK Echelon", 4 Sqn		
6 October 1971 – 18 December 1975	Bloodhound Support Unit		
1 February 1972 – 5 January 1976	100 Sqn	English Electric Canberra	Target-towing and specialist electronic warfare training unit
1 August – 29 September 1972	45 Sqn	Hawker Hunter	Ground-attack unit
1 July 1983 – January 1991	HQ 6 Wing RAF Regiment	Rapier (missile)	Short Range Air Defence Missile Unit
19 December 1975 – 1 July 1991	85 Sqn	Bloodhound missile	Medium-range surface-to-air missile
