= RAF Methwold =

Former RAF station in Norfolk, England

RAF Methwold
- Methwold, Norfolk in England
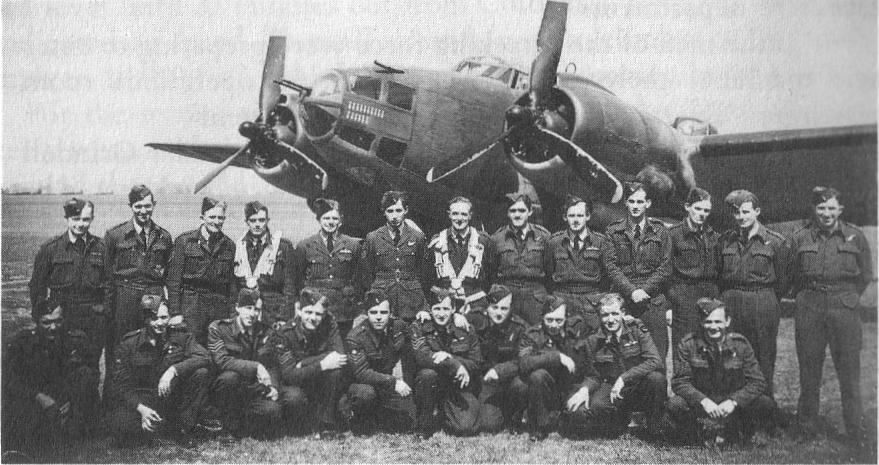
- Squadron NCOs at RAF Methwold early 1943

Site information
- Type: Royal Air Force station
- Owner: Air Ministry
- Operator: Royal Air Force
- Controlled by: RAF Bomber Command

Location
- Shown within Norfolk
- Coordinates: 52.511°N 0.545°E

Site history
- Built: 1938
- In use: 1938-1958
- Battles/wars: Second World War, Cold War

Garrison information
- Garrison: No. 2 Group RAF; No. 3 Group RAF

Airfield information
Runways
Direction	Length and surface
06/24	1,828 metres (5,997 ft) Concrete
11/29	1,463 metres (4,800 ft) Concrete
17/35	1,371 metres (4,498 ft) Concrete

Royal Air Force Methwold or more simply RAF Methwold is a former Royal Air Force station located 2.1 miles (3.4 km) north east of Feltwell, Norfolk and 10.9 miles (17.5 km) north west of Thetford, Norfolk, England.

== History ==
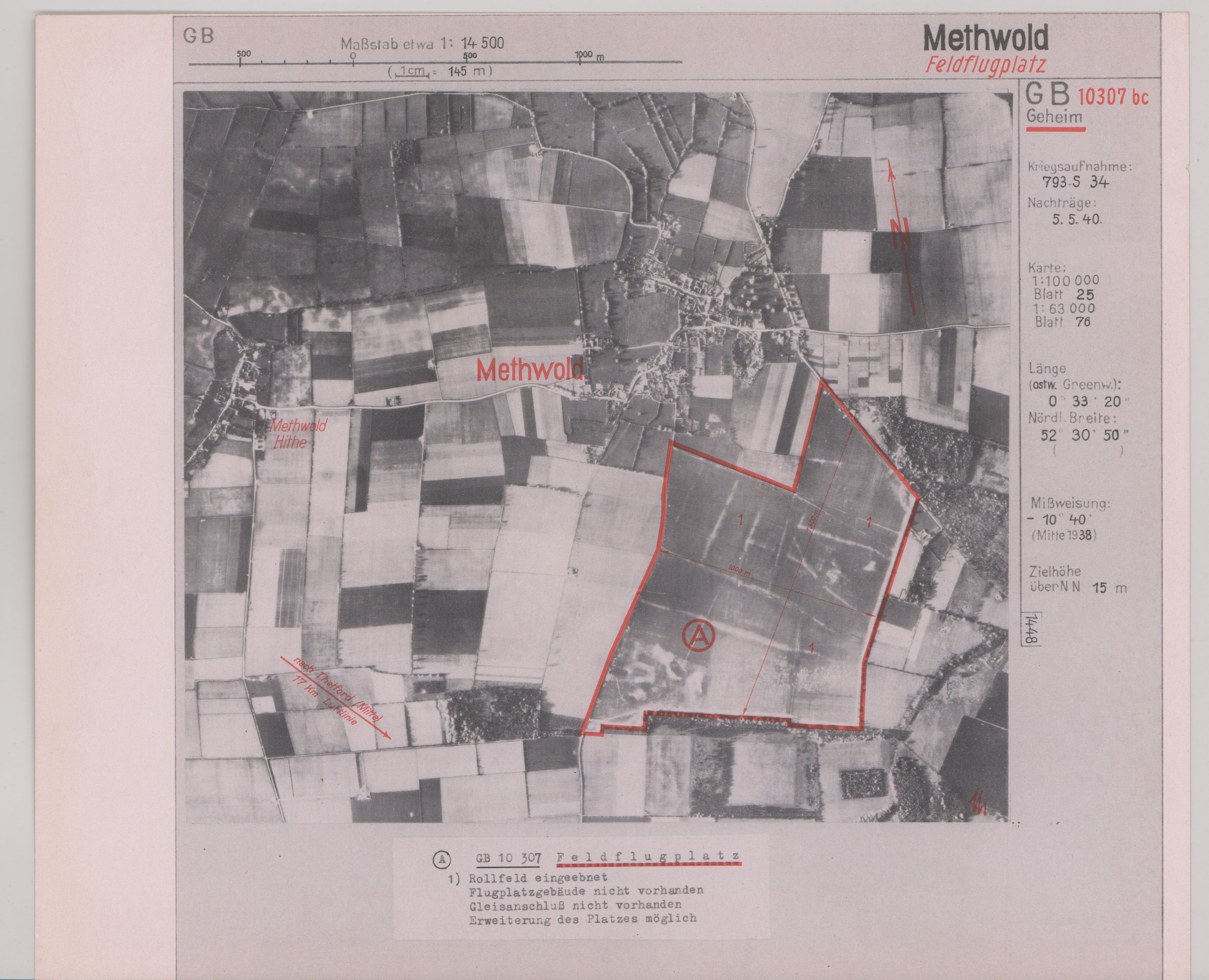
RAF Methwold on a target dossier of the German Luftwaffe, 1940

RAF Methwold opened as a dispersal airfield for RAF Feltwell in the winter of 1938. Vickers Wellington bombers from Feltwell continued to use the site as a satellite base until the grass airfield was transferred to No. 2 Group in the exchange of bases with No. 3 Group, in the summer of 1942. Several asphalt hardstandings were put down for aircraft during 1940–1941.

In August 1943, the airfield was closed to flying while it was upgraded to A standard. Three concrete runways were built, the main aligned on 06-24 (2,000 yards), 11-29 (1,600 yards) and 17-35 (1,500 yards). 36 hardstandings were built, 35 of the loop type and a single pan. The original asphalt pans were not retained.

Following this work, RAF Methwold was a higher standard base than its parent at Feltwell. The airfield was returned to No. 3 Group and became a sub-station of RAF Mildenhall.

43 aircraft either failed to return or crashed during the operations from RAF Methwold; 25 Venturas, 6 Stirlings, and 12 Lancasters.

== Units ==
Based units

- No. 57 Squadron RAF
- No. 214 Squadron RAF
- No. 21 Squadron RAF
- No. 464 Squadron RAAF
- No. 487 Squadron RNZAF
- No. 149 Squadron RAF
- No. 218 Squadron RAF
- No. 207 Squadron RAF
- No. 320 (Netherlands) Squadron RAF
- No. 3 Flying Training School RAF
- No. 3 Service Flying Training School RAF
- No. 21 Heavy Glider Maintenance Section

== Current use ==
After closure as an operational airfield in April 1946, the airfield remained under care and maintenance until it was finally sold in the 1960s. Today the majority of the site has been returned to agriculture, with two hangars remaining in use as agricultural grain stores and two others used for packaging Quorn and Cauldron products (Marlow Foods) for sale in supermarkets. To the southern edge of the site a well-preserved battle headquarters and some gunpits along with a number of air raid shelters may be found.

== See also ==
- List of Norfolk airfields
- List of former Royal Air Force stations
