= No. 515 Squadron RAF =

- Active: 1 Oct 1942 – 10 Jun 1945
- Country: United Kingdom
- Branch: Royal Air Force
- Role: Electronic countermeasures
- Part of: No. 11 Group RAF, Fighter Command; No. 100 Group RAF, Bomber Command
- Mottos: Latin: Cleriter ferite ut hostes nacesit (Translation: "Strike quickly to kill the enemy")

Insignia
- Squadron Badge heraldry: A gauntlet holding a winged dagger in bend sinister, trusting to the dexter
- Squadron Codes: 3P (Feb 1944 – Jun 1945)

No. 515 Squadron RAF was a squadron of the Royal Air Force formed during the Second World War. It ushered in electronic countermeasure (ECM) warfare, jamming enemy radar installations from October 1942 as the only such squadron in the RAF initially. Later in the war 515 Sqn was joined by other squadrons as part of No. 100 Group RAF. The squadron disbanded after VE Day, when the need for such a specialised squadron had reduced.

== History ==
=== Fighter Command ===
The squadron was formed from Defiant Flight, also known as Special Duties Flight – an electronic countermeasuress unit equipped with the Boulton Paul Defiant Mk.II – at RAF Northolt on 1 October 1942, It moved to RAF Heston later that month. As part of 11 Group, 515 Sqn performed radar jamming duties, using Moonshine and Mandrel equipment.

From May 1943, 515 Sqn re-equipped with the Bristol Beaufighter Mk.IIF.

=== Bomber Command ===
The squadron transferred to No. 100 Group RAF in December 1943 as part of Bomber Command, and moved to RAF Little Snoring in Norfolk. There they re-equipped with de Havilland Mosquito Mk.VIs in March 1944, and operated these for the remainder of the war. At the time of its disbandment on 10 June 1945, 515 squadron had carried out 1,366 operational sorties with the Mosquito with a loss of 21 aircraft, with most of its aircrew transferring to No. 627 Squadron RAF. T

== Moonshine ==
Moonshine, developed at the Telecommunications Research Establishment (TRE), was the code-name for ARI TR1427, (Airborne Radio Installation Transmitter Receiver), a British airborne spoofer/jammer installed in the 20 modified Boulton Paul Defiants of No. 515 Squadron RAF to defeat Freya radar.

== Mandrel ==
Mandrel, developed at the TRE and also built in the United States as AN/APT-3, was the code-name for a jammer deployed against Freya and Würzburg radars used by aircraft of 515 sqn and 100 Group.

== Aircraft operated ==
Aircraft operated by no. 515 Squadron RAF, data from
From	To	Aircraft	Version
October 1942	December 1943	Boulton Paul Defiant	Mk.II
June 1943	April 1944	Bristol Beaufighter	Mk.IIf
February 1944	April 1944	de Havilland Mosquito	Mk.II
March 1944	June 1945	de Havilland Mosquito	Mk.VI

== Squadron bases ==
Bases and airfields used by 515 Squadron
From	To	Base	Notes
1 October 1942	29 October 1942	RAF Northolt, Middlesex	Dets. Coltishall, West Malling, Tangmere and Exeter
29 October 1942	31 May 1943	RAF Heston, Middlesex	
31 May 1943	15 December 1943	RAF Hunsdon, Hertfordshire	
15 December 1943	10 June 1945	RAF Little Snoring, Norfolk	

== Commanding officers ==
Officers commanding 515 Squadron
From	To	Name
October 1942	July 1943	S/Ldr. S.R. Thomas, DFC, AFC
July 1943	January 1944	W/Cdr. J.F. Inkster
January 1944	December 1944	W/Cdr. F.F. Lambert, DSO, DFC
December 1944	June 1945	W/Cdr. H.C. Kelsey, DFC

== See also ==
- List of Royal Air Force aircraft squadrons
- Boulton Paul Defiant Operational history
- Freya radar, the German early-warning radar that was jammed using "Moonshine" and "Mandrel"
- List of World War II electronic warfare equipment
