= RAF Little Snoring =

Former RAF station in Norfolk, England

RAF Little Snoring
- Little Snoring, Norfolk in England
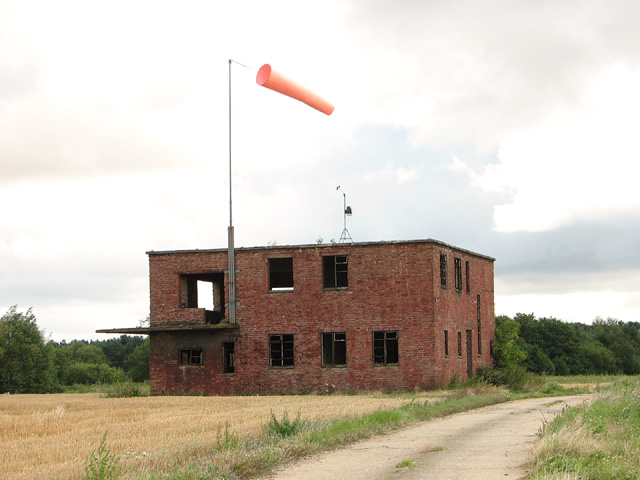
- The old Watch Office, 2014

Site information
- Type: Royal Air Force station
- Code: LS
- Owner: Air Ministry
- Operator: Royal Air Force
- Controlled by: RAF Bomber Command * No. 3 Group RAF * No. 100 (BS) Group RAF

Location
- Shown within Norfolk RAF Little Snoring (the United Kingdom)
- Coordinates: 52°51′43″N 000°54′52″E

Site history
- Built: 1943
- In use: July 1943 - October 1958

Airfield information
- Elevation: 58 metres (190 ft) AMSL
Runways
Direction	Length and surface
01/19	1,280 metres (4,199 ft) Concrete
07/25	1,830 metres (6,004 ft) Concrete
13/31	1,280 metres (4,199 ft) Concrete

Royal Air Force Little Snoring or more simply RAF Little Snoring is a former Royal Air Force station located immediately north of the Norfolk village of Little Snoring, approximately 2 miles (3 km) east-northeast from the town of Fakenham. The airfield remains open for general aviation use as Little Snoring Airfield.

== History ==
The station opened in July 1943 and was built to be a satellite station and dispersal for RAF Foulsham which is 6.0 miles (9.7 km) south-east of Little Snoring. Just a month after the station became operational, the stations status changed when No. 3 Bomber Group gave the station full status.

Squadron	Period	Aircraft
23 Squadron	1944–1945	de Havilland Mosquito VI and XX
115 Squadron	1943	Avro Lancaster II
141 Squadron	1945	de Havilland Mosquito XXX
169 Squadron	1943–1944	de Havilland Mosquito II
515 Squadron	1943–1945	Bristol Beaufighter, de Havilland Mosquito II and VI
1678 Heavy Conversion Flight	1943	Avro Lancaster II

After this the airfield was retained on a care and maintenance until an anti-aircraft co-operation unit on civilian contract operated from Little Snoring for several years during the 1950s. Supermarine Spitfire were the main type used, but were replaced by de Havilland Vampires before the unit was disbanded in 1958.

Additional units

- No. 2 Civilian Anti-Aircraft Co-operation Unit
- No. 15 Heavy Glider Maintenance Section
- No. 274 Maintenance Unit RAF

== Current use ==
The site is currently used as Little Snoring Airfield, operated by the McAully Flying Group, formerly the Fakenham Flying Group. Airfield facilities include a private hangar and a clubhouse with pre-flight briefing facilities, kitchen and toilets. The eastern and southern parts of all three runways have been removed but the remainder are retained for flying.

The airfield is also used for aircraft manufacturing, The Light Aircraft Company has an aircraft maintenance facility which produces the Sherwood Ranger microlight.

The former mortuary is now a toilet and shower block at the villages' camp site. The site also features an air raid shelter and concrete pads for vehicles and temporary buildings.

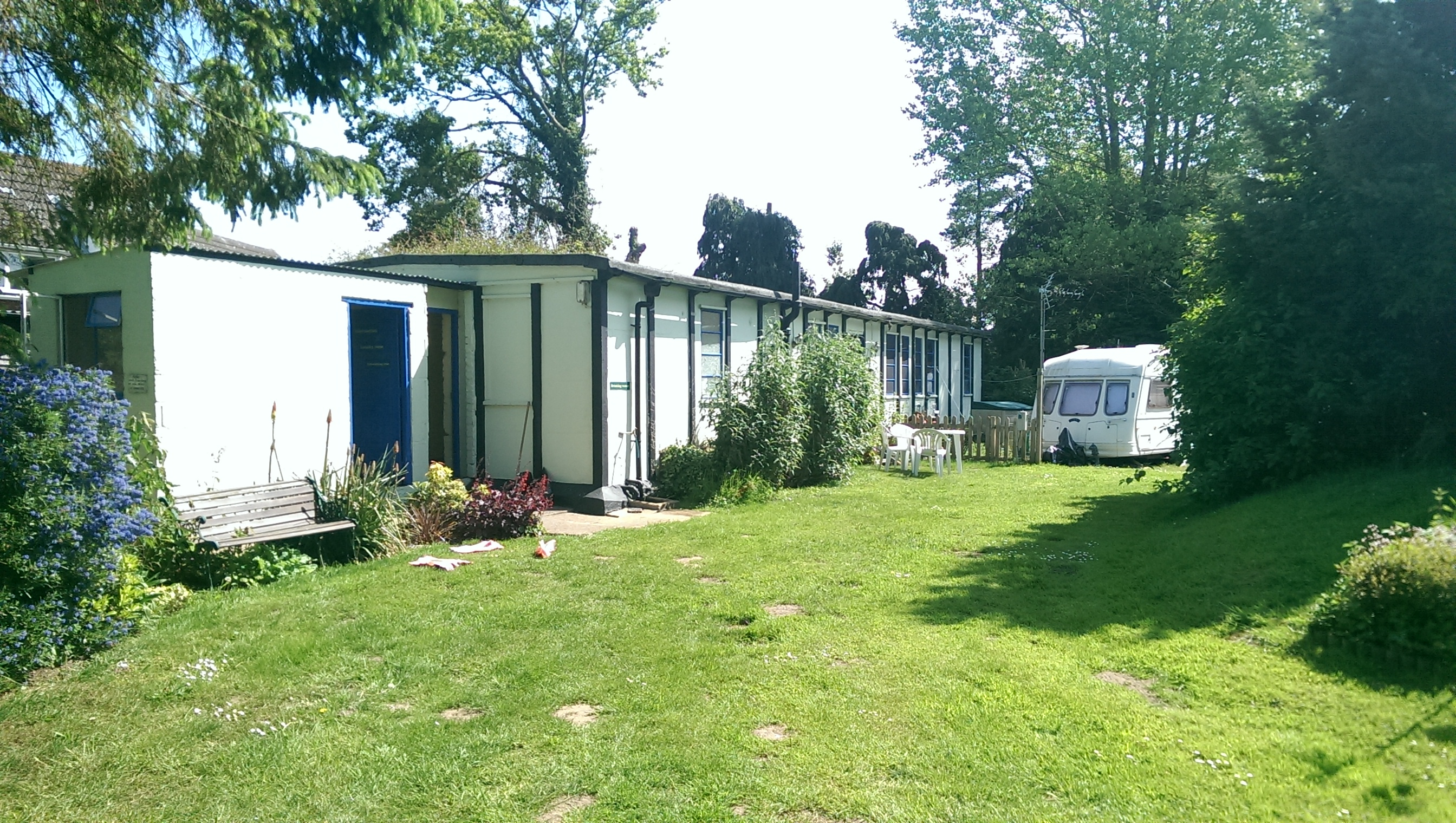
The former mortuary

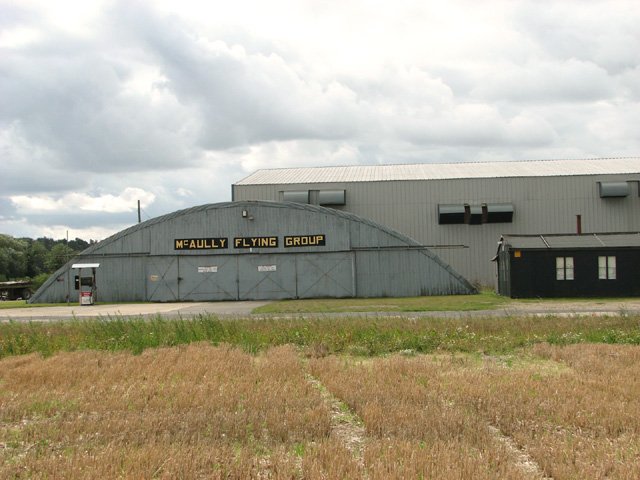
Modern aircraft hangars, 2014
