= RAF Great Massingham =

Former RAF station in Norfolk, England

RAF Great Massingham
- Great Massingham, Norfolk in England
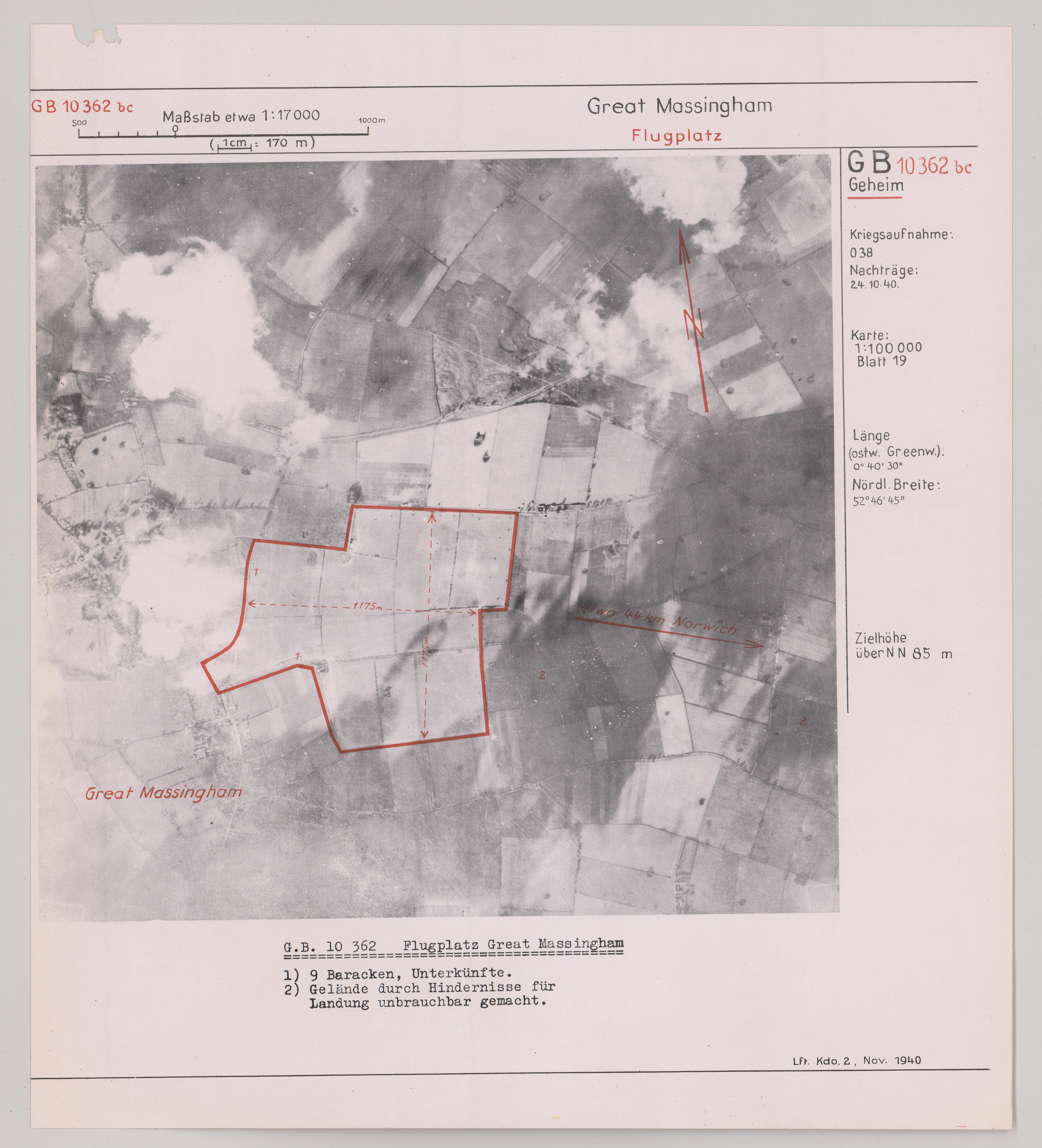
- RAF Great Massingham on a target dossier of the German Luftwaffe, 1940

Site information
- Type: Royal Air Force station
- Code: GM
- Owner: Air Ministry
- Operator: Royal Air Force
- Controlled by: RAF Bomber Command * No. 2 Group RAF * No. 100 (BS) Group RAF

Location
- Shown within Norfolk RAF Great Massingham (the United Kingdom)
- Coordinates: 52°46′50″N 000°40′36″E

Site history
- Built: 1940
- Built by: Unit Construction Co Ltd
- In use: September 1940 - April 1958

Airfield information
- Elevation: 85 metres (279 ft) AMSL
Runways
Direction	Length and surface
03/21	1,200 metres (3,937 ft) Concrete
09/27	1,780 metres (5,840 ft) Concrete
13/31	1,200 metres (3,937 ft) Concrete

Royal Air Force Great Massingham or more simply RAF Great Massingham is a former Royal Air Force station located 8.1 miles (13 km) southwest of Fakenham, Norfolk and 11.7 miles (18.8 km) east of King's Lynn, Norfolk, England.

The airfield was built as a satellite airfield of RAF West Raynham in 1940 but was upgraded to a parent station on 3 June 1944. The airfield closed in 1945, although remained in use for storage until 1958.

== History ==
The following units were posted here at some point:

- No. 18 Squadron RAF 1940–41
- No. 90 Squadron RAF 1941
- No. 107 Squadron RAF 1941
- No. 342 (GB I/20 'Lorraine') Squadron RAF 1943
- No. 169 Squadron RAF 1944–45
- No. 16 Heavy Glider Maintenance Section
- No. 1482 (Bombing) Gunnery Flight
- No. 1692 (Radar Development) Flight RAF became No. 1692 (Bomber Support) Training Flight RAF
- No. 1694 (Target Towing) Flight RAF became No. 1694 Bomber (Defence) Training Flight RAF
- No. 4109 Anti-Aircraft Flight RAF Regiment
- No. 4303 Anti-Aircraft Flight RAF Regiment
- Central Fighter Establishment

== Current use ==
The airfield was sold in 1958 and returned to agricultural use. The runways remained, however, although the control tower was demolished, and the airfield was reactivated for aviation by O.C. Brun Esq.

== See also ==
- List of former Royal Air Force stations
