= RAF Oulton =

Former military airfield in Norfolk, England

RAF Oulton
- Oulton, near Aylsham, Norfolk in England
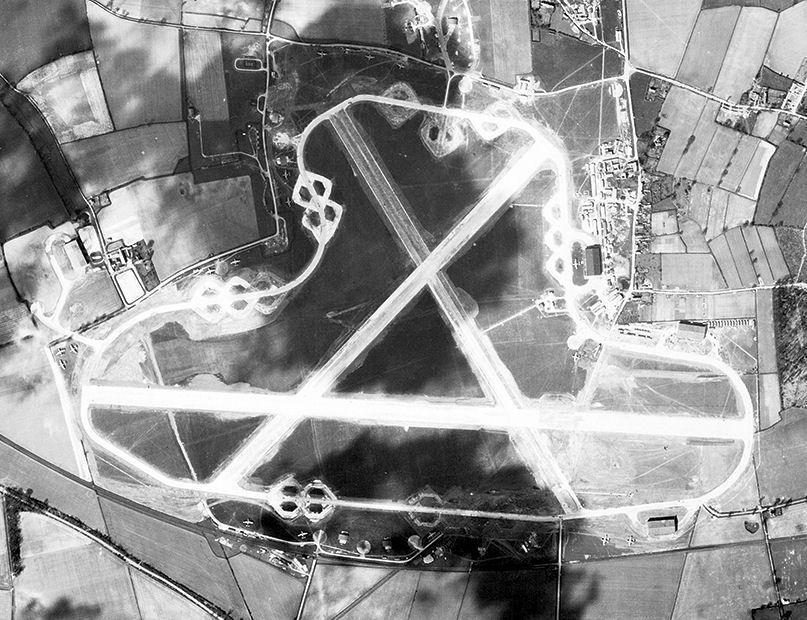
- Aerial photograph of Oulton airfield 20 April 1944

Site information
- Type: Royal Air Force Satellite station
- Owner: Air Ministry
- Operator: Royal Air Force

Location
- Shown within Norfolk
- Coordinates: 52°47′57″N 001°10′53″E

Site history
- Built: 1940
- In use: 1940-1952

Garrison information
- Garrison: No. 2 Group RAF; No. 3 Group RAF; No. 100 Group RAF

Airfield information
- Elevation: 47 metres (154 ft) AMSL
Runways
Direction	Length and surface
06/24	1,220 metres (4,003 ft) Concrete
12/30	1,760 metres (5,774 ft) Concrete
16/34	1,350 metres (4,429 ft) Concrete

Royal Air Force Oulton or more simply RAF Oulton is a former Royal Air Force satellite station located 3 miles (4.8 km) west of Aylsham, Norfolk and 12.5 miles (20.1 km) northwest of Norwich, Norfolk, England.

The airfield was built over 1939 and 1940 as a bomber airfield with T2 type hangars and grass runways, the facility operating as a satellite airfield of nearby RAF Horsham St. Faith between July 1940 and September 1942 after which it operated as a satellite airfield of RAF Swanton Morley.

== History ==
In September 1943, Oulton was transferred from 2 Group to 3 Group and closed to flying for re-construction as a heavy bomber base with concrete runways, taxiways and parking areas. The work was completed in April 1944 and the airfield transferred to No. 100 Group RAF. Flying operations ceased at the end of July 1945, after which it was taken over by RAF Maintenance Command which used it to store de Havilland Mosquitos until November 1947.

RAF Oulton Order of Battle
Squadron	Aircraft	Dates at RAF Oulton
114	Blenheim Mk.IV	July 1940 to March 1941
18	Blenheim Mk.IV	April 1941 to July 1941 and November to December 1941
139	Blenheim Mk.IV	December 1941 to February 1942
1428 Hudson Conversion Flight	Hudson Mk.III	December 1941 to May 1942
236	Beaufighter Mk.IC	July 1942 to September 1942
88	Boston Mk.III and IIIA	September 1942 to March 1943
21	Ventura Mk.I and II	April 1943 to September 1943
No. 1699 (Bomber Support) Flight RAF	Fortress	May 1944 to June 1945
214	Fortress	May 1944 to July 1945
803rd Bomb Squadron	Boeing B-17 Flying Fortress and Consolidated B-24 Liberator	May 1944 to August 1944
223	Flying Fortress and Liberator	August 1944 to July 1945

Additional Units

- No. 18 Heavy Glider Maintenance Section
- No. 274 Maintenance Unit RAF
- No. 1428 (Ferry Training) Flight RAF
- No. 2873 Squadron RAF Regiment
- No. 2874 Squadron RAF Regiment

== Current use ==
The site is now farmland.

== Museum ==
The RAF Oulton Museum is housed on the Blickling Hall estate, belonging to the National Trust.

== See also ==
- List of former Royal Air Force stations
