= No. 171 Squadron RAF =

Defunct flying squadron of the Royal Air Force

- Active: 15 June 1942 – December 1942; 7 September 1944 – 27 July 1945
- Country: United Kingdom
- Branch: Royal Air Force
- Motto: Latin: Per dolum defendimus (Confound the enemy)

Insignia
- Squadron Badge: A portcullis in front of a displayed eagle
- Squadron codes: 6Y (1944–1945)

No. 171 Squadron RAF was a Royal Air Force Squadron that was a coastal reconnaissance and radio countermeasures unit in World War II.

== History ==
=== Formation in World War II ===
The squadron formed on 15 June 1942 at Gatwick and equipped with Tomahawk and then Mustang aircraft, it was disbanded in December 1942 and then reformed on 8 September 1944 at North Creake, equipped with Stirling III and then Halifax Radio Countermeasures aircraft. It finally disbanded on 27 July 1945.

== Aircraft operated ==
Aircraft operated by no. 171 Squadron RAF
| From | To | Aircraft | Variant |
|---|---|---|---|
| Jun 1942 | Dec 1942 | CurtissTomahawk | I |
| Sep 1942 | Dec 1942 | P-51 Mustang | IA |
| Sep 1944 | Jan 1945 | Short Stirling | III |
| Oct 1944 | Jul 1945 | Handley Page Halifax | III |
