= 84th Bombardment Squadron =

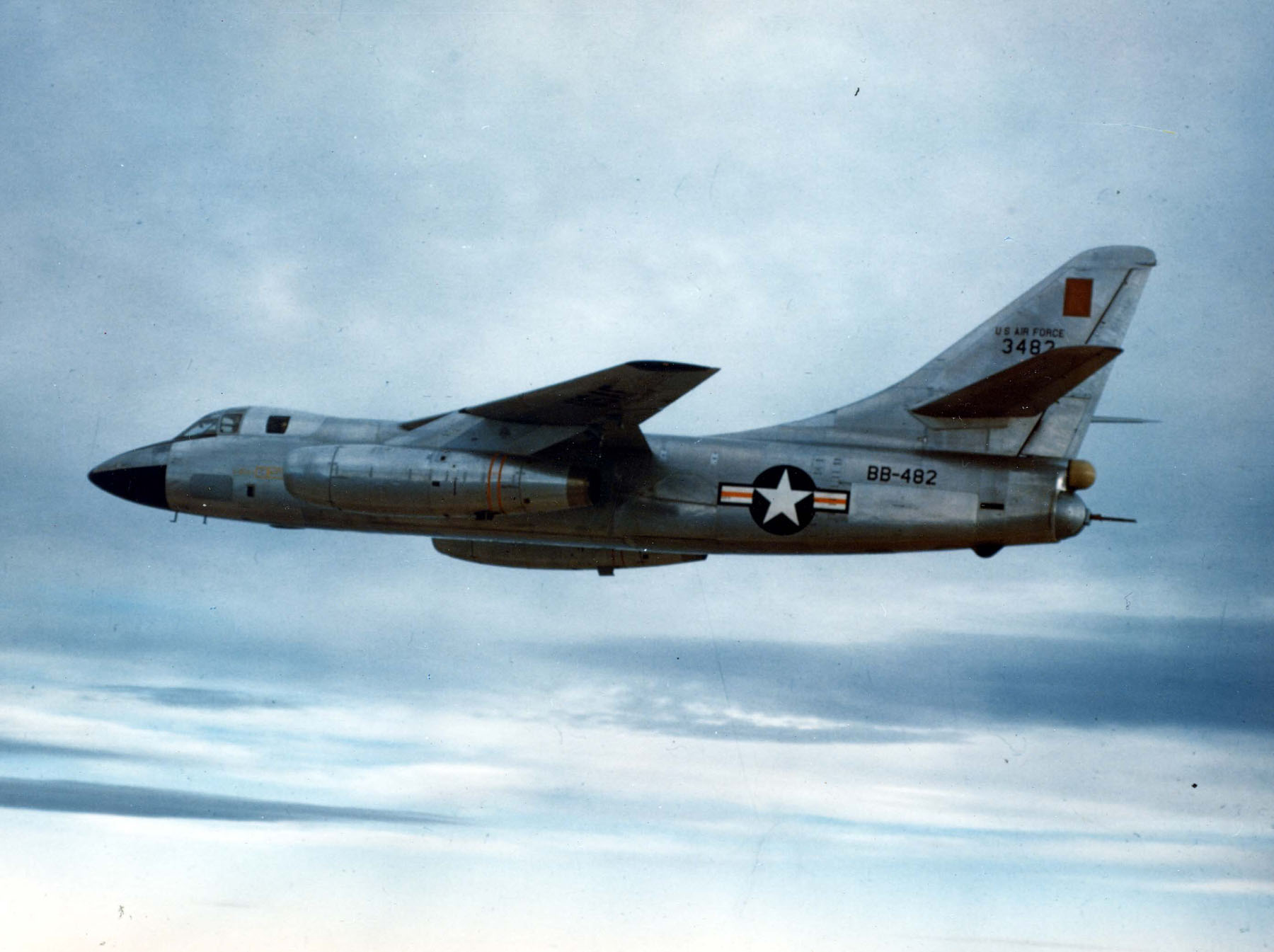
- B-66 Destroyer as flown by the squadron
- Active: 1941-1962
- Country: United States
- Branch: United States Air Force
- Role: Tactical Bombardment
- Engagements: Mediterranean Theater of Operations
- Decorations: Distinguished Unit Citation; Air Force Outstanding Unit Award

Insignia
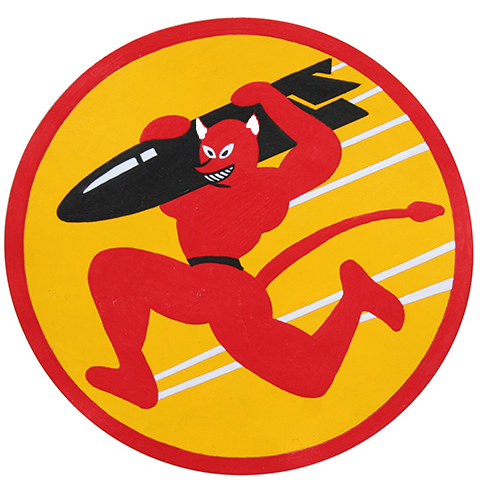
- 84th Bombardment Squadron emblem (approved 9 September 1942)

The 84th Bombardment Squadron is an inactive United States Air Force unit. It was last assigned to the post-World War II-era 47th Bombardment Wing, stationed at RAF Sculthorpe, England. It was inactivated on 22 June 1962.

== History ==
Antisubmarine patrols, Dec 1941-Jan 1942. Combat in MTO, 22 Jan 1943 – 30 Apr 1945. Cold War NATO tactical bombardment squadron. See 47th Operations Group for extended history.

== Lineage ==
- Constituted as the 84th Bombardment Squadron (Light) on 20 Nov 1940

Activated on 15 Jan 1941
Redesignated 84th Bombardment Squadron, Light on 20 August 1943
Redesignated 84th Bombardment Squadron, Light (Night Intruder) on 16 April 1946
Redesignated 84th Bombardment Squadron, Light, Jet on 23 June 1948
Redesignated 84th Bombardment Squadron, Light c. 16 November 1950
Redesignated 84th Bombardment Squadron, Tactical on 1 October 1955
Discontinued, and inactivated, on 22 Jun 1962

=== Assignments ===
- 47th Bombardment Group, 15 January 1941
- Twelfth Air Force, 2 October 1949
- Ninth Air Force, 17 October 1949 (attached to 363d Tactical Reconnaissance Group)
- Tactical Air Command, 1 August 1950 (attached to 363d Tactical Reconnaissance Wing after 1 September 1950)
- 47th Bombardment Group, 12 March 1951
- 47th Bombardment Wing, 8 February 1955 – 22 June 1962

=== Stations ===
- McChord Field, Washington, 15 January 1941
- Fresno Army Air Base, California, 11 August 1941
- Will Rogers Field, Oklahoma, 17 February 1942
- Greensboro Army Air Base, North Carolina, 16 July–c. 17 October 1942
- Médiouna Airfield, French Morocco, c. 18 November 1942
- Youks-les-Bains Airfield, Algeria, 6 January 1943
- Canrobert Airfield, Algeria, 29 March 1943
- Thelepte Airfield, Tunisia, 5 April 1943
- Souk-el-Arba Airfield, Tunisia, 13 April 1943
- Soliman Airfield, Tunisia, c. 1 June 1943
- RAF Hal Far, Malta, 21 July 1943
- Torrente Comunelli Airfield, Sicily, 10 August 1943
- Gerbini Airfield, Sicily, 20 August 1943
- Grottaglie Airfield, Italy, 24 September 1943
- Vincenzo Airfield, Italy, 15 October 1943
- Vesuvius Airfield, Italy, 11 January 1944
- Capodichino Airport, Italy, 22 March 1944
- Vesuvius Airfield, Italy, 25 April 1944
- Ponte Galeria Airfield, Italy, 10 June 1944
- Ombrone Airfield, Italy, 24 June 1944
- Poretta Airfield, Corsica, 15 July 1944
- Salon-de-Provence Air Base, France, 5 September 1944
- Follonica Airfield, Italy, 22 September 1944
- Rosignano Airfield, Italy, 4 October 1944
- Grosseto Airfield, Italy 2 January 1945
- Pisa Airfield, Italy, 17–22 June 1945
- Seymour Johnson Field, North Carolina, c. 12 July 1945
- Lake Charles Army Air Field, Louisiana, 9 September 1945
- Biggs Field, Texas, 20 October 1946
- Barksdale Air Force Base, Louisiana, 19 November 1948
- Langley Air Force Base, Virginia, 17 October 1949 – 21 May 1952
- RAF Sculthorpe, England, 31 May 1952 – 22 June 1962

=== Aircraft ===
- Douglas B-18 Bolo, 1941-1942
- Douglas A-20 Havoc, 1942-1945
- Douglas A-26 Invader (later B-26), 1945-1949
- North American B-45 Tornado, 1949-1957
- Douglas B-66 Destroyer, 1958-1962
