= 86th Flying Training Squadron =

86th Flying Training Squadron

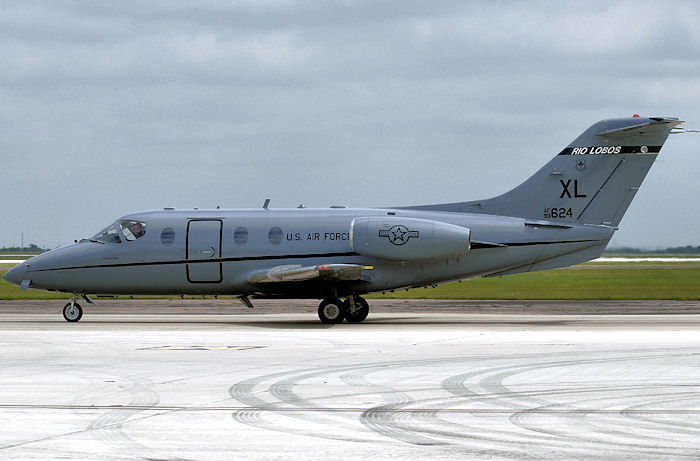
- 86th Flying Training Squadron T-1 Jayhawk
- Active: 1941–1949; 1954–1962; 1972–1992; 1993–present
- Country: United States
- Branch: United States Air Force
- Role: Pilot Training
- Part of: Air Education and Training Command
- Garrison/HQ: Laughlin Air Force Base
- Engagements: Mediterranean Theater of Operations
- Decorations: Distinguished Unit Citation; Air Force Outstanding Unit Award

Insignia
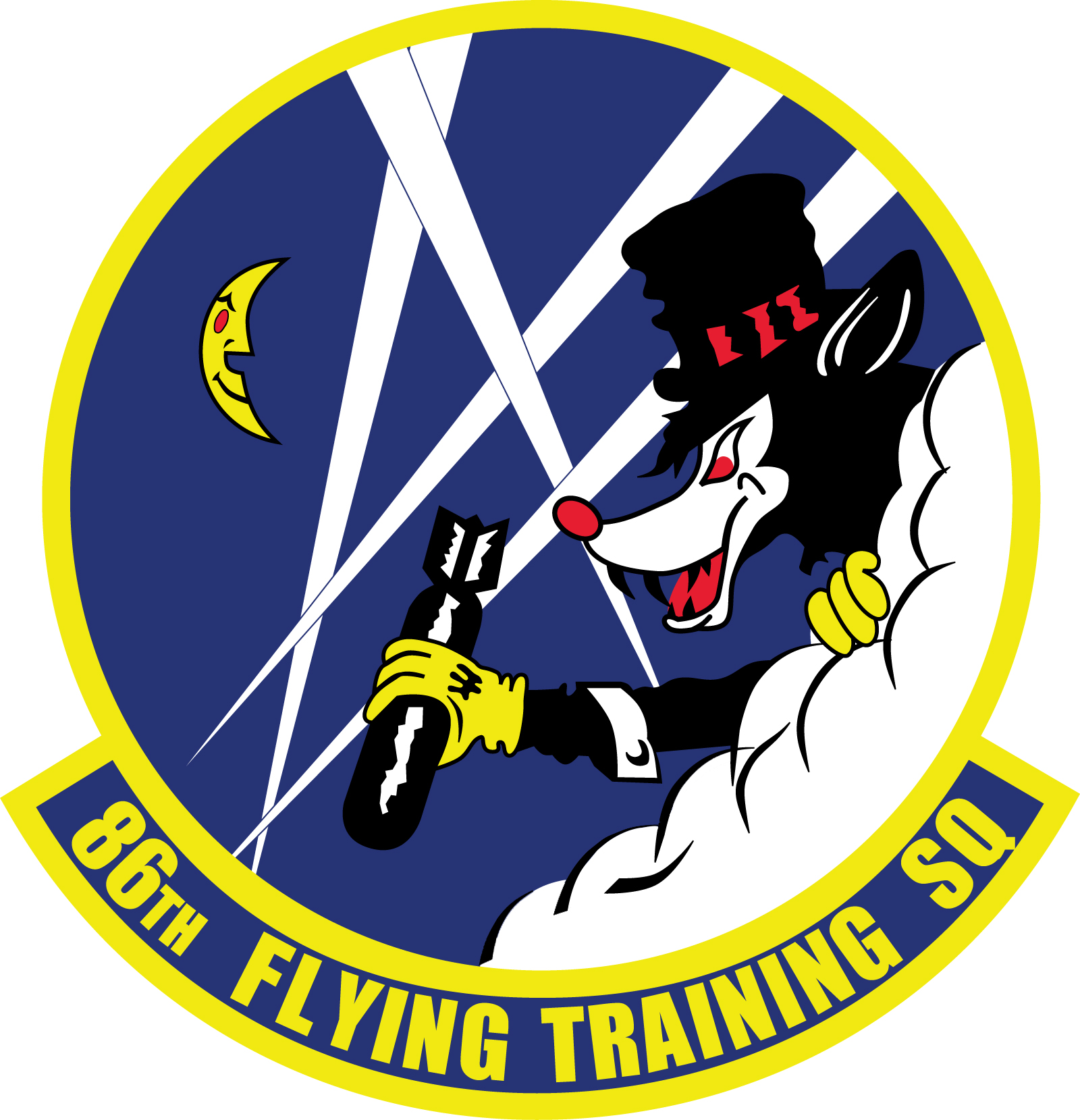
- 86th Flying Training Squadron emblem (modified and restored 22 May 1995)

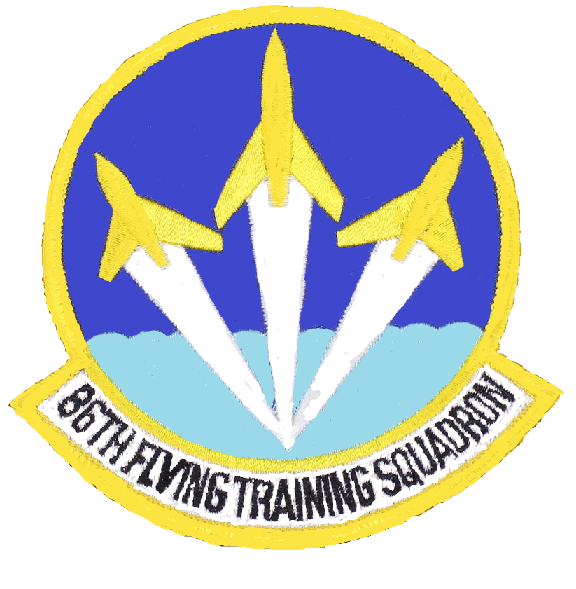
- 86th Flying Training Squadron emblem (approved 20 February 1973)

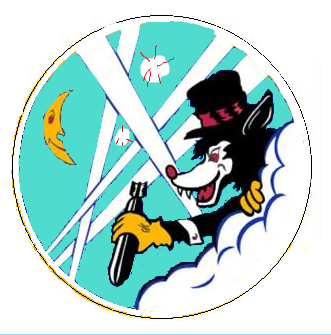
- 86th Bombardment Squadron emblem (approved 8 March 1945)

The 86th Flying Training Squadron is part of the 47th Flying Training Wing at Laughlin Air Force Base, Texas. It operates Raytheon T-1 Jayhawk aircraft conducting flight training.

== Mission ==
Currently, the mission of the 86th Flying Training Squadron is to educate and train undergraduate pilots to fly the T-1A Jayhawk which prepares them to fly mobility and tanker aircraft, such as the C-130J Super Hercules.

== History ==
=== World War II ===
On 20 November 1940, a new squadron was designated the 86th Bombardment Squadron, Light. Activated on 15 January 1941 and stationed at McChord Field, Washington, its primary mission was antisubmarine patrols utilizing Douglas B-18 Bolo aircraft. In the six years that followed, the 86th traveled to all parts of the world. The mission was later expanded to include training personnel for overseas duty and combat operations.

In 1942, the 86th started its journey through various parts of Europe and North Africa. It was stationed in approximately 20 different locations including French Morocco, Canrobert Airfield, Algeria, and Salon-de-Provence Airfield, France. During that time, the 86th supported combat operations with the Douglas DB-7 and Douglas A-20 Havoc and the Douglas A-26 Invader aircraft. The 86th Bombardment Squadron received numerous campaign streamers and the Distinguished Unit Citation in 1943 and again in 1945. It went on to fly combat missions in the Mediterranean Theater of Operations from 14 December 1942 until 30 April 1945.

=== Bomber operations in the United States ===
In 1945, the 86th returned to the United States to begin training in support of a new mission of night tactical operations. Stationed at Biggs Field, Texas, in 1946, and then Barksdale Air Force Base, Louisiana, in 1948, the 86th was redesigned the 86th Bombardment Squadron, Light, Jet, flying the A-26 and then B-45 aircraft. With the slowdown of military operations, the 86th was inactivated in 1949.

=== Bomber operations in Europe ===
On 23 March 1954, the 86th Bombardment Squadron, Light, jet was reactivated. It was stationed at Sculthorpe RAF Station and Alconbury RAF station, England, flying the B-45 and B-66 aircraft. On 1 Oct 1955, the 86th was redesigned as the 86th Bombardment Squadron, Tactical. The 86th remained in England, maintaining proficiency in a variety of tactical operations and was awarded the Air Force Outstanding Unit Award for operations from July 1958 to June 1960.

Through the early years of the Cold War the 86th transitioned to the North American B-45 Tornado and later the Douglas B-66 Destroyer aircraft and served as a bomber unit, primarily stationed in England.

=== Flying training ===
On 22 March 1972, the 86th was redesignated the 86th Flying Training Squadron. The former 3646th Pilot Training Squadron at Laughlin Air Force Base was discontinued and its personnel and equipment transferred to the 86th and the squadron continued to train undergraduate student pilots in the Northrop T-38 Talon. From 1976 to 1979, the squadron also trained Strategic Air Command co-pilots in the ACE program. The squadron was inactivated in September 1992. During its twenty years as a pilot training squadron, the 86th Flying Training Squadron earned five Air Force Outstanding Unit Awards.

On 17 February 1994, the 86th Flying Training Squadron was reactivated. The training mission continues utilizing the T-1A Jay Hawk for Specialized Undergraduate Pilot Training. Today, the squadron flies the Raytheon T-1 Jayhawk conducting the specialized undergraduate pilot training phase for airlift-tanker-bomber track pilots.

== Lineage ==
- Constituted as the 86th Bombardment Squadron (Light) on 20 November 1940

Activated on 15 January 1941
Redesignated 86th Bombardment Squadron, Light on 20 August 1943
Redesignated 86th Bombardment Squadron, Light (Night Attack) on 16 April 1946
Redesignated 86 Bombardment Squadron, Light, Jet on 23 June 1948
Inactivated on 2 October 1949

- Redesignated 86th Bombardment Squadron, Light on 1 March 1954

Activated on 23 March 1954
Redesignated 86th Bombardment Squadron, Tactical on 1 Oct 1955
Discontinued and inactivated on 22 June 1962

- Redesignated 86th Flying Training Squadron on 22 March 1972

Activated on 1 September 1972
Inactivated on 15 September 1992

- Activated on 1 December 1993

=== Assignments ===
- 47th Bombardment Group, 15 January 1941 – 2 October 1949
- 47th Bombardment Group, 23 March 1954 (attached to 47th Bombardment Wing)
- 47th Bombardment Wing, 8 February 1955 – 22 June 1962
- 47th Flying Training Wing, 1 September 1972
- 47th Operations Group, 15 December 1991 – 15 September 1992
- 47th Operations Group, 1 December 1993 – present

=== Stations ===
- McChord Field, Washington, 15 January 1941
- Army Air Base Fresno, California, 11 August 1941
- Will Rogers Field, Oklahoma, 15 Feb 1942
- Greensboro Army Air Base, North Carolina, 16 July–17 October 1942
- Mediouna Airfield, French Morocco, 17 November 1942
- Youks-les-Bains Airfield, Algeria, December 1942
- Canrobert Airfield, Algeria, 21 February 1943
- Thelepte Airfield, Tunisia, 30 March 1943
- Souk-el-Arba Airfield, Tunisia, 16 April 1943
- Soliman Airfield, Tunisia, c. 1 Jun 1943
- Ta Kali Airdrome, Malta, 22 July 1943
- Torrente Comunelli, Sicily, Italy 13 Aug 1943
- Gerbini Airfield, Sicily, 19 August 1943
- Grottaglie Airfield, Italy, 27 September 1943
- Vincenzo Airfield, Italy, 12 October 1943
- Vesuvius Airfield, Italy, 13 Jan uary1944
- Capodichino Airport, Italy, 22 March 1944
- Vesuvius Airfield, Italy, 25 April 1944
- Ponte Galeria Airfield, Italy, 9 June 1944
- Ombrone Airfield, Italy, 23 June 1944
- Poretta Airfield, Corsica, France, 12 Jul 1944
- Salon-de-Provence Airfield (Y-16), France, 5 September 1944;
- Follonica Airfield, Italy, 19 September 1944
- Rosignano Airfield, Italy, 4 October 1944
- Grosseto Airfield, Italy, 2 January 1945
- Pisa Airport, Italy, 15–23 June 1945
- Seymour Johnson Field, North Carolina (1945)
- Lake Charles Army Air Field, Louisiana, 9 September 1945
- Biggs Field, (later Biggs Air Force Base), Texas, 20 October 1946
- Barksdale Air Force Base, Louisiana, 19 November 1948 – 2 October 1949
- RAF Sculthorpe, England, 23 March 1954
- RAF Alconbury, England, 15 September 1955
- RAF Sculthorpe, England, 5 August 1959 – 22 June 1962
- Laughlin Air Force Base, Texas, 1 September 1972 – 15 September 1992
- Laughlin Air Force Base, Texas, 1 December 1993 – present

=== Aircraft ===
- Douglas B-18 Bolo (1941–1942)
- Douglas DB-7 Boston (1942)
- Douglas A-20 Havoc (1942–1945)
- Douglas A-26 (later B-26) Invader (1945–1949)
- North American B-45 Tornado (1949, 1954–1958)
- Douglas B-66 Destroyer (1958–1962)
- Northrop T-38 Talon (1972–1992)
- Raytheon T-1 Jayhawk (1993–2024)

=== Campaigns ===
World War II: Antisubmarine, American Theater; Algeria-French Morocco; Tunisia; Sicily; Naples-Foggia; Anzio; Rome-Arno; Southern France; North Apennines; Po Valley; Air Combat, EAME Theater

=== Decorations ===
Distinguished Unit Citations: North Africa, 22 Feb 1943; Po Valley, 21-24 Apr 1945. Air Force Outstanding Unit Awards: 1 Jul 1958 – 30 Jun 1960; 1 Jan-31 Dec 1973; 1 Jan 1976 – 28 Feb 1977; 1 Jan 1979-30 Apr 1980; 1 May 1982 – 29 Feb 1984; 1 Mar 1985-28 Feb 1987; [1 Mar] 1987-31 Mar 1988; 16 Mar 1989 – 15 Mar 1991; 1 Jul 1991-[15 Sep 1992]; [1 Dec 1993]-30 Jun 1995; 1 Jul 1997 – 30 Jun 1999; 1 Sep 2003-30 Jun 2005; 1 Jul 2005 – 30 Jun 2007
