= 85th Flying Training Squadron =

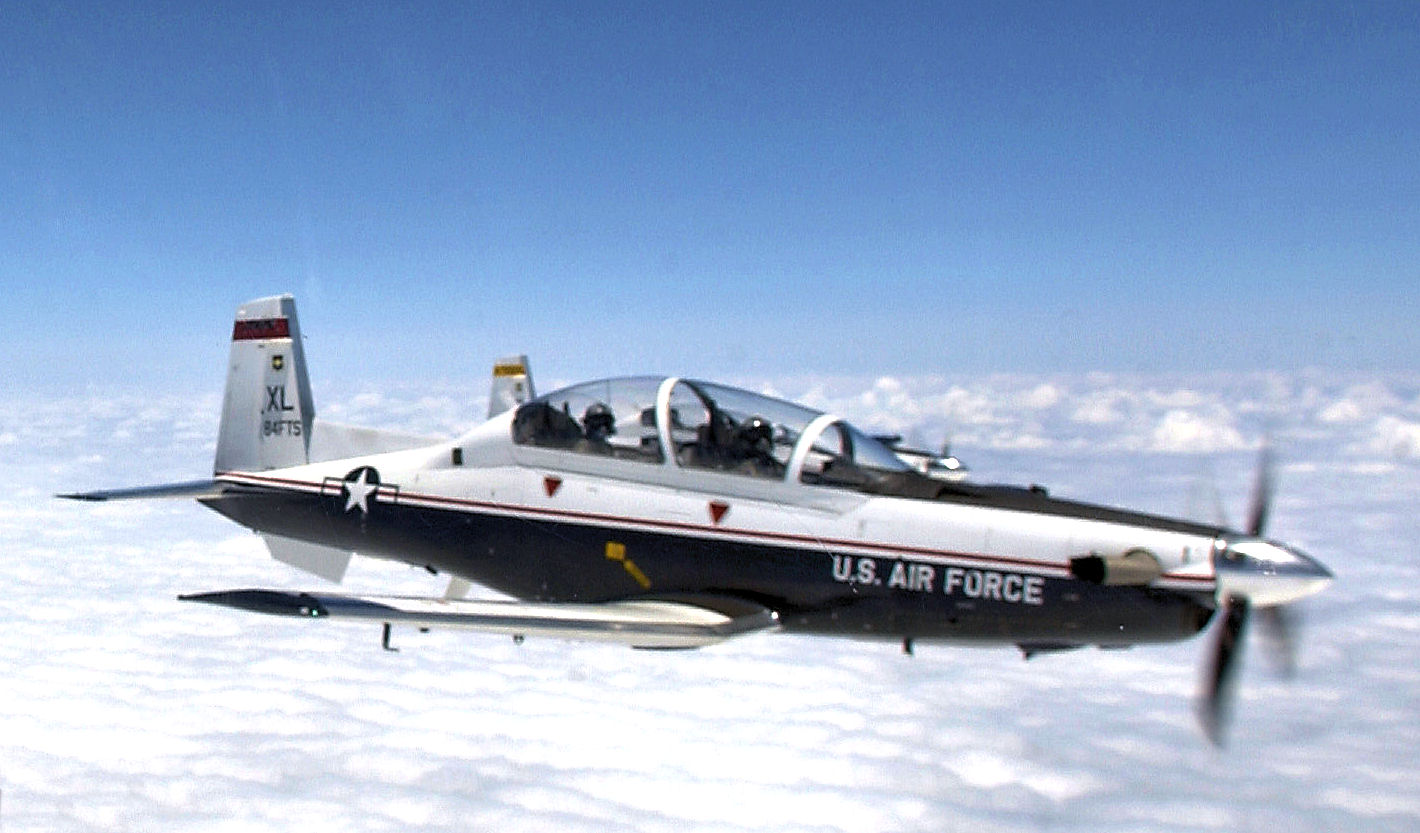
- T-6A Texan IIs from Laughlin AFB
- Active: 1941–1962; 1972-present
- Country: United States
- Branch: United States Air Force
- Role: Pilot Training
- Part of: Air Education and Training Command
- Garrison/HQ: Laughlin Air Force Base
- Engagements: Battle of the Kasserine Pass; Operation Husky; Operation Avalanche; Operation Dragoon
- Decorations: Distinguished Unit Citation; Air Force Outstanding Unit Award

Commanders
- Current commander: Lt Col Kristof “Brick” Lieber

Insignia
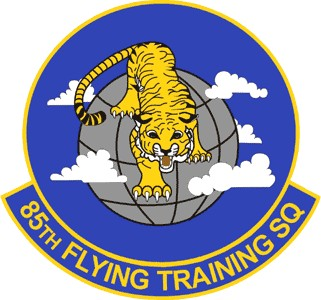
- 85th Flying Training Squadron emblem (approved 2 January 1973)

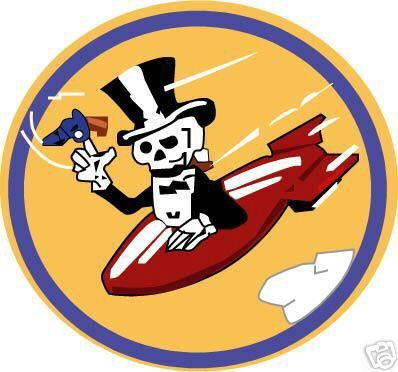
- 85th Bombardment Squadron emblem (approved 9 September 1944)

The 85th Flying Training Squadron is part of the 47th Flying Training Wing based at Laughlin Air Force Base, Texas. It operates Beechcraft T-6 Texan II aircraft conducting flight training.

== Mission ==
The current mission of the 85th Flying Training Wing is to take recent undergraduate pilots, from Air Force Reserve Officer Training Corps or the United States Air Force Academy and qualify them to fly the T-6 Texan II aircraft.

== History ==
=== World War II ===
The 85th was first activated as a bombardment squadron shortly before the United States entered World War II. Stationed at McChord Field, Washington it flew antisubmarine patrols following the attack on Pearl Harbor.

The squadron was sent to North Africa to participate in Allied operations in the Mediterranean Theater of Operations in late 1942 where it specialized in conducting low-level bombing missions against Axis forces. The unit earned a Distinguished Unit Citation for actions against German forces at Kasserine Pass in February 1943.

Following the Axis defeat in North Africa the 85th participated in the reduction of Pantellaria and Lampedusa and the invasion of Sicily in the summer of 1943. The squadron next supported the British Eighth Army during the invasion of Italy and continued to lead support combat support throughout the Italian Campaign, earning it a second Distinguished Unit Citation for actions in the Po Valley 21–24 April 1945. In August and September 1944 the 85th briefly broke off from the Italian Campaign to support the invasion of southern France.

=== Cold War ===
Following the Second World War the squadron remained an active bomber unit. It was the first squadron to operate the North American B-45 Tornado, the US Air Force's first jet bomber. It later transitioned to the Douglas B-66 Destroyer before being inactivated in May 1962.

=== Pilot training ===
The squadron was reactivated a decade later as a flying training squadron, replacing the 3645th Pilot Training Squadron at Laughlin Air Force Base, Texas.

== Lineage ==
- Constituted as the 85th Bombardment Squadron (Light) on 20 November 1940

Activated on 15 January 1941
Redesignated 85th Bombardment Squadron, Light on 20 August 1943
Redesignated 85th Bombardment Squadron, Light (Night Attack) on 16 April 1946
Redesignated 85th Bombardment Squadron, Light, Jet on 23 June 1948
Redesignated 85th Bombardment Squadron, Light on 16 November 1950
Redesignated 85th Bombardment Squadron, Tactical on 1 October 1955
Discontinued and inactivated on 22 June 1962

- Redesignated 85th Flying Training Squadron on 22 March 1972

Activated on 1 September 1972

=== Assignments ===
- 47th Bombardment Group, 15 January 1941
- Twelfth Air Force, 2 October 1949
- Ninth Air Force (attached to 363d Tactical Reconnaissance Group), 17 October 1949
- Tactical Air Command, 1 Aug 1950 (remained attached to 363d Tactical Reconnaissance Group until 31 August 1950, then to 363d Tactical Reconnaissance Wing)
- 47th Bombardment Group, 12 Mar 1951 (attached to 47th Bombardment Wing after 17 Nov 1952)
- 47th Bombardment Wing, 8 February 1955 – 22 June 1962
- 47th Flying Training Wing, 1 September 1972
- 47th Operations Group, 15 December 1991 – present

=== Stations ===
- McChord Field, Washington (1941)
- Army Air Base Fresno, California, 11 August 1941
- Will Rogers Field, Oklahoma, 17 February 1942
- Greensboro Army Air Base, North Carolina, 16 July–17 October 1942
- Mediouna Airfield, French Morocco, c. 17 November 1942
- Thelepte Airfield, Tunisia, 9 January 1943
- Youks-les-Bains Airfield, Algeria, 16 February 1943
- Canrobert Airfield, Algeria, 27 February 1943
- Thelepte Airfield, Tunisia, 30 March 1943
- Souk-el-Arba Airfield, Tunisia, 16 April 1943
- Soliman Airfield, Tunisia, 1 June 1943
- Malta, 22 July 1943
- Sicily, Italy, 12 August 1943
- Grottaglie Airfield, Italy, 24 September 1943
- Vincenzo Airfield, Italy, 15 October 1943
- Vesuvius Airfield, Italy, 11 January 1944
- Capodichino Airport, Italy, 22 March 1944
- Vesuvius Airfield, Italy, 25 April 1944

- Ponte Galeria Airfield, Italy, 13 Jun 1944
- Ombrone Airfield, Italy, 26 June 1944
- Poretta Airfield, Corsica, France, 15 July 1944
- Salon-de-Provence Airfield (Y-16), France, 4 Sep 1944
- Follonica Airfield, Italy, 16 September 1944
- Rosignano Airfield, Italy, 4 October 1944
- Grosseto Airport, Italy, 10 December 1944
- Pisa Airfield, Italy, 17–23 June 1945
- Seymour Johnson Field, North Carolina, c. 11 July 1945
- Lake Charles Army Air Field, Louisiana, 9 September 1945
- Biggs Field, Texas, 20 October 1946
- Barksdale Air Force Base, Louisiana, 19 November 1948
- Langley Air Force Base, Virginia, 17 October 1949 – 21 May 1952
- RAF Sculthorpe, England, 31 May 1952 – 22 June 1962
- Laughlin Air Force Base, Texas, 1 September 1972 – present)

=== Aircraft ===
- B-18 Bolo (1941–1942)
- DB-7 Boston (1941–1942)
- A-20 Havoc (1941–1945)
- A-26 Invader (later, B-26) (1945–1949, 1950–1951)
- North American B-45 Tornado (1949–1957)
- Douglas B-66 Destroyer (1958–1962)
- T-37 Tweet (1972–2004)
- T-6 Texan II (2004 – present)
