= 97th Air Refueling Squadron =

97th Air Refueling Squadron

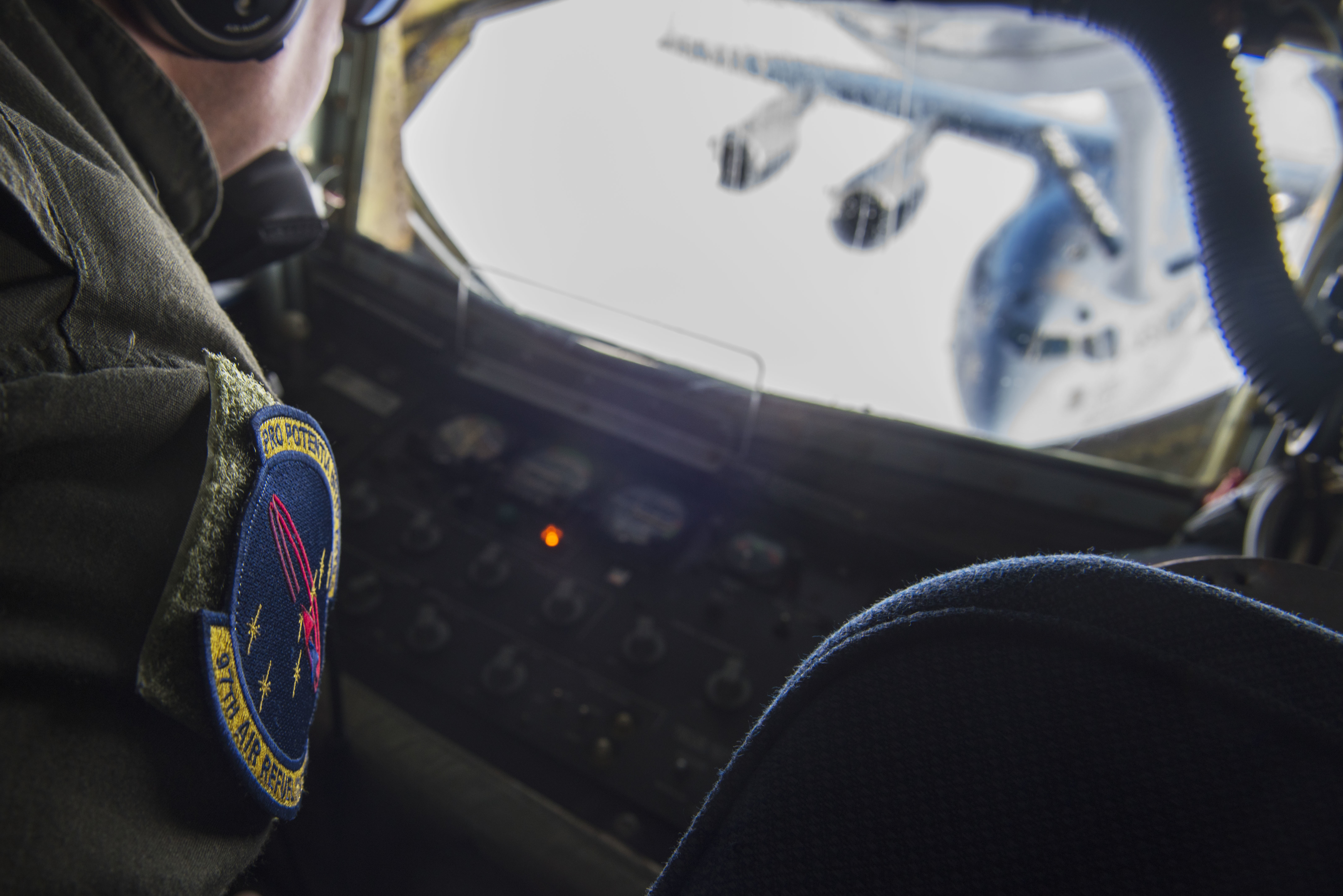
- One of the squadron's boom operators conducts an aerial refueling of a C-17 Globemaster III over Washington, 2020
- Active: 1941–1946; 1949–1964; 1964–1992; 1992–2004; 2019–present
- Country: United States
- Branch: United States Air Force
- Role: Aerial Refueling
- Part of: Air Mobility Command: Eighteenth Air Force; 92nd Air Refueling Wing; 92nd Operations Group
- Garrison/HQ: Fairchild Air Force Base, Washington
- Mottos: Pro Potentia Inter Astra (Latin: "For Strength Among the Stars")
- Engagements: Mediterranean Theater of Operations
- Decorations: Distinguished Unit Citation; Air Force Meritorious Unit Award; Air Force Outstanding Unit Award

Insignia
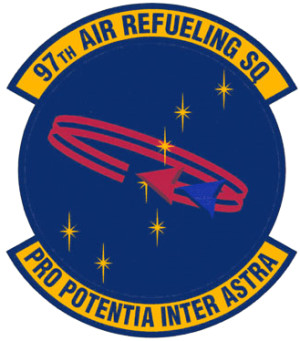
- 97th Air Refueling Squadron emblem (approved 9 December 1994)

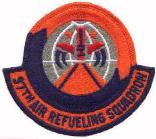
- 97th Air Refueling Squadron emblem (approved 10 September 1965)

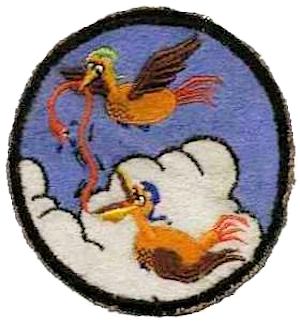
- 97th Air Refueling Squadron emblem (approved 2 November 1955)

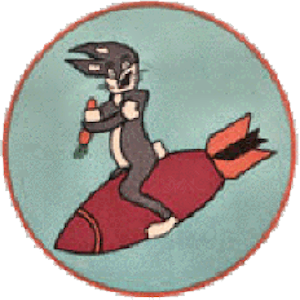
- 97th Bombardment Squadron emblem (approved 9 August 1944)

The 97th Air Refueling Squadron is an active unit of the United States Air Force, stationed at Fairchild Air Force Base, Washington. It was most recently activated on 1 October 2019 and assigned to the 92nd Operations Group, 92nd Air Refueling Wing.

The squadron was first activated in January 1941 as the 20th Reconnaissance Squadron. Seven months after activation, it was renamed the 97th Bombardment Squadron and assigned to the 47th Bombardment Group. It performed antisubmarine patrols off the Pacific coast following the entry of the United States into World War II. Three months later, it began training for light bomber operations, and in November 1942 it deployed to the Mediterranean Theater of Operations. The squadron engaged in combat in northern Africa, Italy and France until V-E Day, earning two Distinguished Unit Citations for its actions there. The 97th returned to the United States in the summer of 1945 and was inactivated at Lake Charles Army Air Field, Louisiana in March 1946.

The 97th Air Refueling Squadron was one of the Air Force's first air refueling units, activated in 1949. It was active continuously until 2004, except for brief interruptions in 1964 and 1992. The squadron served with Boeing KB-29s until 1954 at Biggs Air Force Base, Texas, when it upgraded to Boeing KC-97 Stratofreighters. In 1957 it moved north to Malmstrom Air Force Base, Montana, where it served until 1964 when the KC-97 was being phased out of the active force inventory.

The squadron was soon activated with Boeing KC-135 Stratotankers at Blytheville Air Force Base, Arkansas. In 1985, the two squadrons were consolidated there into a single unit. The consolidated squadron provided crews and aircraft to Strategic Air Command (SAC) units in the Pacific during the Vietnam War and deployed elements that served in Desert Storm. In 1992, it was inactivated as SAC was closing what had been renamed Eaker Air Force Base.

The squadron was again activated a few months later, returning to Malmstrom as part of Air Mobility Command's tanker fleet. It moved to Fairchild Air Force Base, Washington two years later and remained there until its inactivation in 2004.

== History ==
=== World War II ===
The squadron was first activated as the 20th Reconnaissance Squadron at McChord Field, Washington in January 1941, attached to the 17th Bombardment Group, and equipped with Douglas B-18 Bolos. In May, it was attached to the 47th Bombardment Group and was assigned to the 47th group and redesignated the 97th Bombardment Squadron in August.

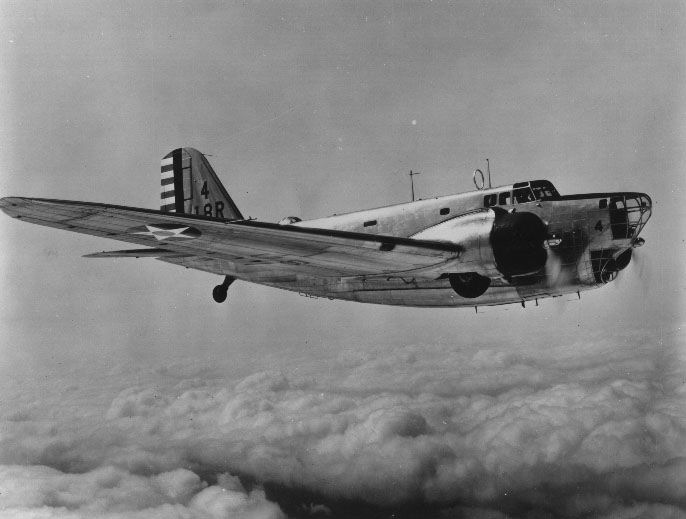
Douglas B-18A assigned to a reconnaissance squadron

After the Pearl Harbor Attack it was equipped with Douglas DB-7 Bostons and early-model Consolidated B-24 Liberators, (Note: Some or all of the B-24s may have been LB-30s. Maurer, Combat Squadrons, p. 323) to perform antisubmarine patrols along the Pacific coast. In February 1942, with a Japanese submarine attack unlikely, the squadron moved to Will Rogers Field, Oklahoma, re-equipped with Douglas A-20 Havoc light bombers and trained for overseas deployment.

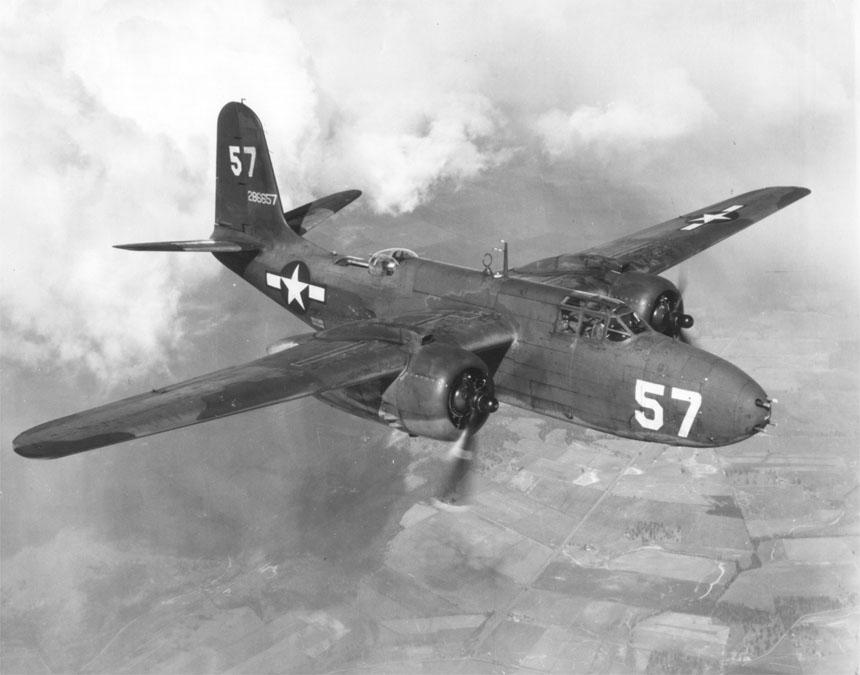
Douglas A-20 as flown by the squadron in the MTO

In November 1942, the 97th deployed to French Morocco as part of Operation Torch, the invasion of French North Africa. The squadron engaged in close air support and air interdiction missions during the North African Campaign. It began operations by flying low-level missions in December, continuing these tactics through May 1943.

In February 1943, the Afrika Corps broke through American lines at the Kasserine Pass. Although the unit was undermanned and short of supplies it flew missions on 22 February against advancing enemy armor, helping to blunt the enemy attack. For this action, the 97th was awarded the Distinguished Unit Citation.

The squadron remained active in combat, but also trained for medium altitude bombing missions in April and May. In June 1943 it participated in the reduction of the islands of Pantelleria and Lampedusa. In July, the unit participated in Operation Husky, the invasion of Sicily, attacking German forces evacuating the island from beaches near Messina the following month. September 1943 saw the launch of Operation Avalanche, the invasion of Italy. During Avalanche, the squadron provided support for the British Eighth Army. It participated in the Italian Campaign and advance toward Rome until the spring of 1944.

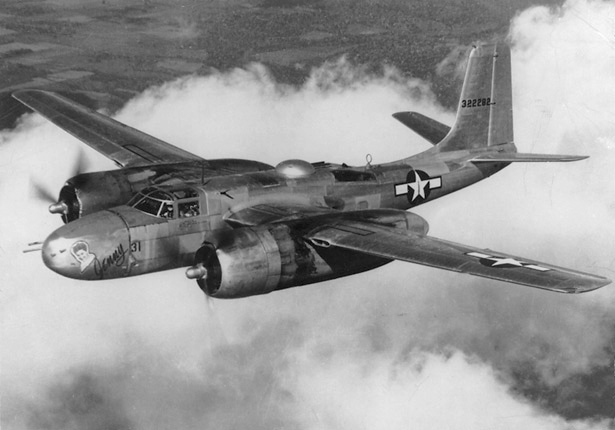
Douglas A-26, which replaced the A-20 in 1945

In August and September 1944, the unit provided support for Operation Dragoon, the invasion of southern France.

The squadron then returned to Italy, where it attacked German communications and other targets, including tanks, bivouac areas, supply dumps, troop concentrations, roads, bridges, airfields and railways.

The 97th upgraded to Douglas A-26 Invaders in early 1945. In April 1945, the squadron and the rest of the 47th group maintained attacks on enemy transportation in the Po River Valley for sixty consecutive hours despite bad weather and adverse terrain. The attacks prevented the orderly withdrawal of German forces from northern Italy. For this action, the squadron earned a second Distinguished Unit Citation.

The squadron returned to the United States in July 1945, and was initially stationed at Seymour Johnson Field, North Carolina. It moved to Lake Charles Army Air Field in September, where it trained as a pathfinder unit.

The unit remained active until March 1946, when the 47th group reduced from four to three squadrons.

=== Air Refueling ===
==== Propeller-driven tankers in Texas and Montana ====
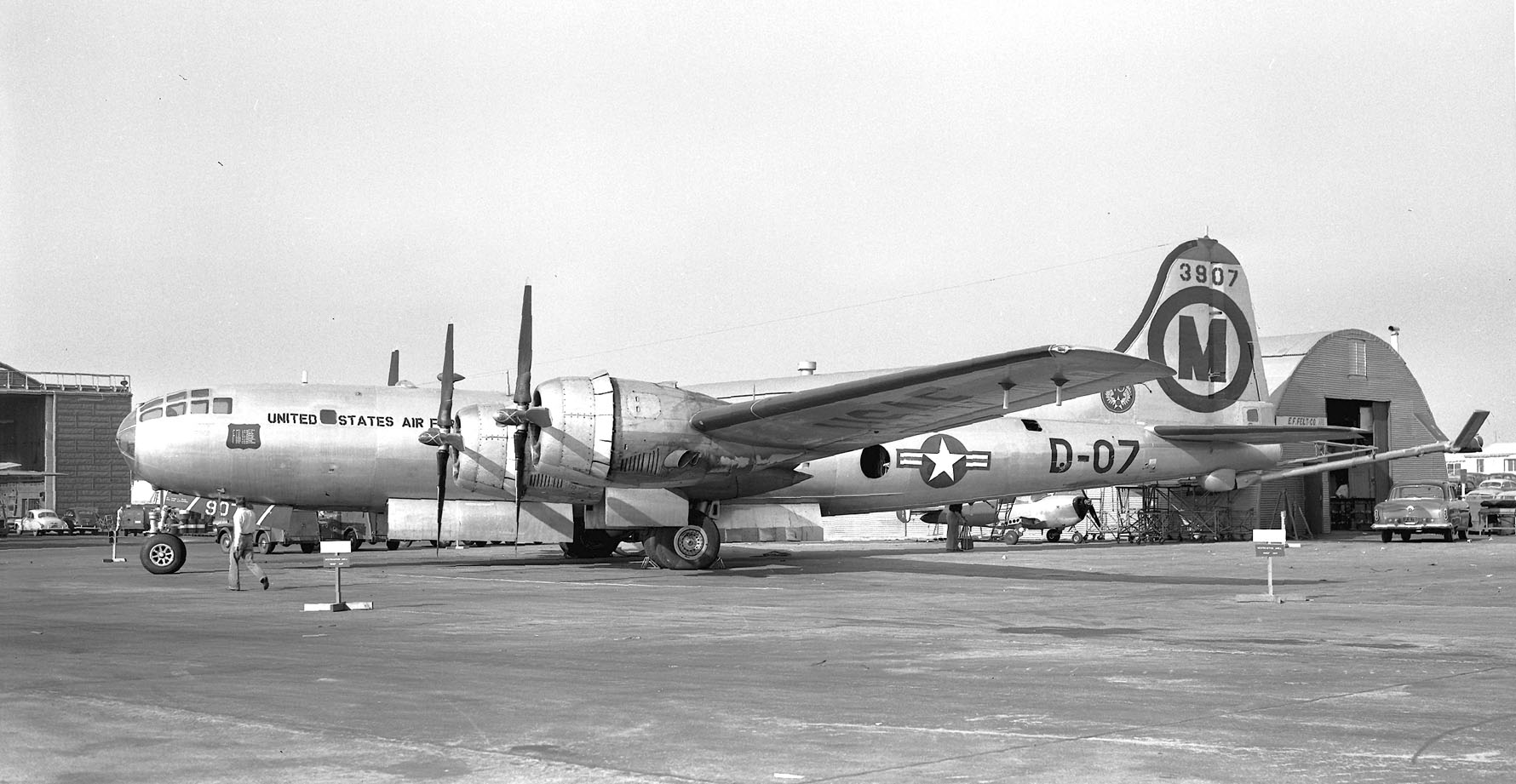
Boeing KB-29P

The 97th Air Refueling Squadron was activated in March 1949 and assigned to the 97th Bombardment Group at Biggs Air Force Base, Texas. The squadron was initially equipped with the Boeing KB-29M Superfortress. The KB-29M was equipped with a hose system developed by the British in which the tanker trailed a hose to the receiver and fuel was gravity-fed. The tanker trailed a "hauling line" which was trapped by the receiver, reeled in and attached to the receiver fuel system. The system was perilous and the KB-29Ms were retired in a few years.

On 1 September 1950, the squadron was the first to receive the improved KB-29P, which was equipped with a boom and used pumps to deliver the fuel more rapidly. However, the squadron remained below strength until 1952.

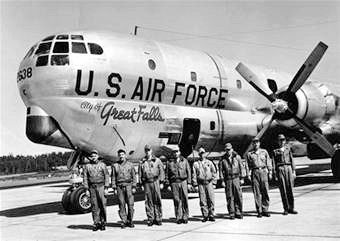
KC-97 of the 97th Air Refueling Squadron at Malmstrom AFB

The squadron upgraded to Boeing KC-97 Stratofreighters in 1954. The unit frequently deployed from Biggs to England, Newfoundland and Labrador, completing its last unit deployment as it was moving to Montana. In the mid-1950s, Strategic Air Command (SAC) began to move its KC-97 refueling strength to the northern United States. The move to Montana-based the squadron ahead of the faster Boeing B-47 Stratojets it would refuel, and on their programmed route.

In 1957, the squadron moved to Malmstrom Air Force Base to fill out the 4061st Air Refueling Wing, which had been formed the previous month with the 407th Air Refueling Squadron. During the 1958 Lebanon Crisis, the squadron provided support for the 92d Bombardment Wing. In July 1961, the 4061st wing was inactivated and the 97th was assigned to the 9th Bombardment Wing at Mountain Home Air Force Base, although it remained at Malmstrom and was attached to the host 341st Combat Support Group there. It was discontinued in March 1964 as part of the phaseout of KC-97 aircraft from the active duty force.

==== Jet tankers in Arkansas ====
The 97th ARS was redesignated as a heavy unit and organized on 8 October 1964 at Blytheville Air Force Base, Arkansas, where it assumed the mission, personnel and Boeing KC-135 Stratotankers of the 914th Air Refueling Squadron, which was simultaneously inactivated. The squadron provided air refueling primarily to the Boeing B-52 Stratofortresses of the 97th Bombardment Wing, Heavy, which had also moved from Texas almost five years prior. One half of the squadron's aircraft were maintained on fifteen-minute alert, fully fueled and ready for combat to reduce vulnerability to a Soviet missile strike.

In addition to its alert commitment, the squadron deployed aircraft and aircrews to support Tanker Task Forces in Europe, the Pacific and Alaska. During the Vietnam War, from the mid 1960s, the squadron deployed forces to the Pacific to other units to support Operation Arc Light and Operation Rolling Thunder. By mid-1972 all of the squadron's tankers were operating with other Strategic Air Command units in the Pacific. In September 1985, the 97th was consolidated with the 97th Bombardment Squadron into a single unit. In 1990, the consolidated squadron flew 93 sorties in direct support of Desert Shield and Desert Storm. It deployed to the Persian Gulf area, where it supported the 801st Bombardment Wing (Provisional) and the 802d Air Refueling Wing (Provisional). The squadron remained active until April 1992, when it was inactivated as Eaker Air Force Base was closing.

The squadron returned to Malmstrom Air Force Base when it was reactivated in October 1992. At Malmstrom, it was equipped with the re-engined KC-135R tankers. The squadron continued to support deployed Tanker Task Forces throughout the world, including periodic support for the 1700th Strategic Wing (Provisional) in Riyadh, Saudi Arabia. It also participated in Operation Restore Hope in Somalia. The squadron moved to Fairchild Air Force Base, Washington in July 1994 as Air Mobility Command reorganized its refueling units. It remained active there until September 2004.

The squadron activated at Fairchild AFB on 18 October 2019 with the Boeing KC-135 Stratotanker.

== Lineage ==
97th Bombardment Squadron

- Constituted as the 20th Reconnaissance Squadron (Light) on 20 November 1940

Activated on 15 January 1941
Redesignated 97th Bombardment Squadron (Light) on 14 August 1941
Redesignated 97th Bombardment Squadron, Light on 20 August 1943
Inactivated on 31 March 1946

- Consolidated with the 97th Air Refueling Squadron as the 97th Air Refueling Squadron on 19 September 1985

97th Air Refueling Squadron

Constituted as the 97th Air Refueling Squadron, Medium on 2 February 1949
Activated on 1 March 1949
Discontinued and inactivated on 15 March 1964

- Redesignated 97th Air Refueling Squadron, Heavy and activated on 8 October 1964 (not organized)

Organized on 23 October 1964

- Consolidated with the 97th Bombardment Squadron on 19 September 1985

Redesignated 97th Air Refueling Squadron on 1 September 1991
Inactivated on 1 April 1992

- Activated on 1 October 1992

Inactivated on 30 September 2004

- Activated on 1 October 2019

=== Assignments ===
- General Headquarters Air Force (later, Air Force Combat Command), 15 January 1941 (attached to 17th Bombardment Group until 7 May 1941, then 47th Bombardment Group)
- 47th Bombardment Group, 14 August 1941 – 31 March 1946
- 97th Bombardment Group, 1 March 1949 (attached to 97th Bombardment Wing after 12 July 1950)
- 97th Bombardment Wing, 16 June 1952 (attached to Fifteenth Air Force, c. 31 May 1955 – 10 July 1955)
- 4061st Air Refueling Wing, 1 September 1957
- 9th Bombardment Wing (later 9th Strategic Aerospace Wing) (attached to 341st Combat Support Group), 15 July 1961
- 28th Bombardment Wing, 1 July 1962 – 15 March 1964
- Strategic Air Command, 8 October 1964 (not organized)
- 97th Bombardment Wing, 23 October 1964
- 97th Operations Group, 1 September 1991 – 1 April 1992
- 43rd Operations Group, 1 October 1992
- 453rd Operations Group, 1 April 1994
- 92nd Operations Group, 1 July 1994 – 30 September 2004
- 92nd Operations Group, 1 October 2019 – present

=== Stations ===
- McChord Field, Washington, 15 January 1941
- Army Air Base, Fresno (later Hammer Field), California, 11 August 1941
- Will Rogers Field, Oklahoma, 15 February 1942
- Greensboro Airport, North Carolina, 16 July 1942
- Langley Field, Virginia, 6–27 October 1942
- Casablanca, French Morocco, 7 November 1942
- Mediouna Airfield, French Morocco, 18 November 1942
- Thelepte Airfield, Tunisia, 27 December 1942
- Youks-les-Bains Airfield, Algeria, 15 February 1943
- Canrobert Airfield, Algeria, 21 February 1943
- Thelepte Airfield, Tunisia, 31 March 1943
- Souk-el-Arba Airfield, Tunisia, c. 30 April 1943
- Grombalia Airfield, Tunisia, 1 June 1943
- Takali Airdrome, Malta, 23 July 1943
- Torrente Comunelli Airfield, Sicily, Italy, 12 August 1943
- Catania Airport, Sicily, Italy, 19 August 1943
- Grottaglie Airfield, Italy, c. 24 September 1943
- Vincenzo Airfield, Italy, 17 October 1943
- Vesuvius Airfield, Italy, c. 8 January 1944
- Capodichino Airport, Italy, 22 March 1944
- Vesuvius Airfield, Italy, 26 April 1944
- Ponte Galeria Airfield, Italy, 12 June 1944
- Grosseto Airport, Italy, 28 June 1944
- Poretta Airport, Corsica, France, 15 July 1944
- Salon-de-Provence, France (Y-16), 7 September 1944
- Follonica Airfield, Italy, 19 September 1944
- Rosignano Airfield, Italy, 9 October 1944
- Grosseto Airport, Italy, 6 December 1944
- Pisa Airport, Italy, 31 March – 25 June 1945
- Camp Kilmer, New Jersey, 11 July 1945
- Seymour Johnson Field, North Carolina, 14 July 1945
- Lake Charles Army Air Field, Louisiana, 9 September 1945 – 31 March 1946
- Biggs Air Force Base, Texas, 1 March 1949
- Deployed to:

RAF Upper Heyford, England 15 March – 1 June 1952
Ernest Harmon Air Force Base, Newfoundland, 21 November – 20 December 1954
Ernest Harmon Air Force Base, Newfoundland c. 31 May – 10 July 1955
RAF Greenham Common, England 1 May – 9 July 1956
Goose Air Force Base, Labrador – 1 April September 1957

- Malmstrom Air Force Base, Montana, 1 September 1957 – 15 March 1964
- Blytheville Air Force Base (later Eaker Air Force Base), Arkansas, 8 October 1964 – 1 April 1992
- Malmstrom Air Force Base, Montana, 1 October 1992
- Fairchild Air Force Base, Washington, 1 April 1994 – 30 September 2004
- Fairchild Air Force Base, Washington, 1 October 2019 – present

=== Aircraft ===
- Douglas B-18 Bolo (1941–1942)
- Consolidated B-24 Liberator (1941–1942)
- Douglas DB-7 Boston (1942)
- Douglas A-20 Havoc (1942–1945)
- Douglas A-26 Invader (1945–1946)
- Boeing B-29 Superfortress (1950)
- Boeing KB-29 Superfortress (1950–1954)
- Boeing KC-97 Stratofreighter (1954–1964)
- Boeing KC-135 Stratotanker (1964–2004)
- Boeing KC-135 Stratotanker (2019–present)

=== Awards and campaigns ===
Award streamer	Award	Dates	Notes
	Presidential Unit Citation	22 February 1942	North Africa, 97th Bombardment Squadron
	Presidential Unit Citation	21 April 1945 – 30 April 1945	Po Valley, 97th Bombardment Squadron
	Air Force Meritorious Unit Award	1 June 2003 – 30 September 2004	97th Air Refueling Squadron
	Air Force Outstanding Unit Award	1 June 1955 – 1 September 1957	97th Air Refueling Squadron
	Air Force Outstanding Unit Award	2 July 1957 – 3 November 1957	97th Air Refueling Squadron
	Air Force Outstanding Unit Award	1 July 1975 – 30 June 1977	97th Air Refueling Squadron
	Air Force Outstanding Unit Award	1 July 1977 – 30 June 1978	97th Air Refueling Squadron
	Air Force Outstanding Unit Award	1 July 1978 – 30 June 1980	97th Air Refueling Squadron
	Air Force Outstanding Unit Award	1 July 1980 – 30 June 1982	97th Air Refueling Squadron
	Air Force Outstanding Unit Award	1 July 1986 – 30 June 1988	97th Air Refueling Squadron
	Air Force Outstanding Unit Award	1 July 1986 – 30 June 1988	97th Air Refueling Squadron
	Air Force Outstanding Unit Award	1 July 1995 – 30 June 1997	97th Air Refueling Squadron
	Air Force Outstanding Unit Award	1 January 1998 – 30 June 1999	97th Air Refueling Squadron

Campaign Streamer	Campaign	Dates	Notes
	Antisubmarine	31 December 1941 – 15 February 1942	97th Bombardment Squadron
	Algeria-French Morocco	8 November 1942 – 11 November 1942	97th Bombardment Squadron
	Tunisia	12 November 1942 – 13 May 1943	97th Bombardment Squadron
	Sicily	14 May 1943 – 17 August 1943	97th Bombardment Squadron
	Naples-Foggia	18 August 1943 – 21 January 1944	97th Bombardment Squadron
	Anzio	22 January 1944 – 24 May 1944	97th Bombardment Squadron
	Rome-Arno	22 January 1944 – 9 September 1944	97th Bombardment Squadron
	Southern France	15 August 1944 – 14 September 1944	97th Bombardment Squadron
	North Apennines	10 September 1944 – 4 April 1945	97th Bombardment Squadron
	Po Valley	3 April 1945 – 8 May 1945	97th Bombardment Squadron
	Air Combat, EAME Theater	7 November 1942 – 11 May 1945	97th Bombardment Squadron

== See also ==
- List of MAJCOM wings of the United States Air Force
- List of United States Air Force air refueling squadrons
