= Canrobert =

Canrobert (English: /kænroʊˈbɛər/, French: [kɑ̃ʁɔbɛʁ]) may refer to:

== People ==
- François Certain de Canrobert (1809–1895), French general, Marshal of France

== Places ==
- Canrobert Airfield, a World War II military airfield, located approximately 4 km south of Oum El Bouaghi in Algeria
- Avenue du Maréchal Canrobert, an avenue in Pontoise in France
- Place du Maréchal Canrobert, a square in Saint-Privat-la-Montagne in France
