= 47th Operations Group =

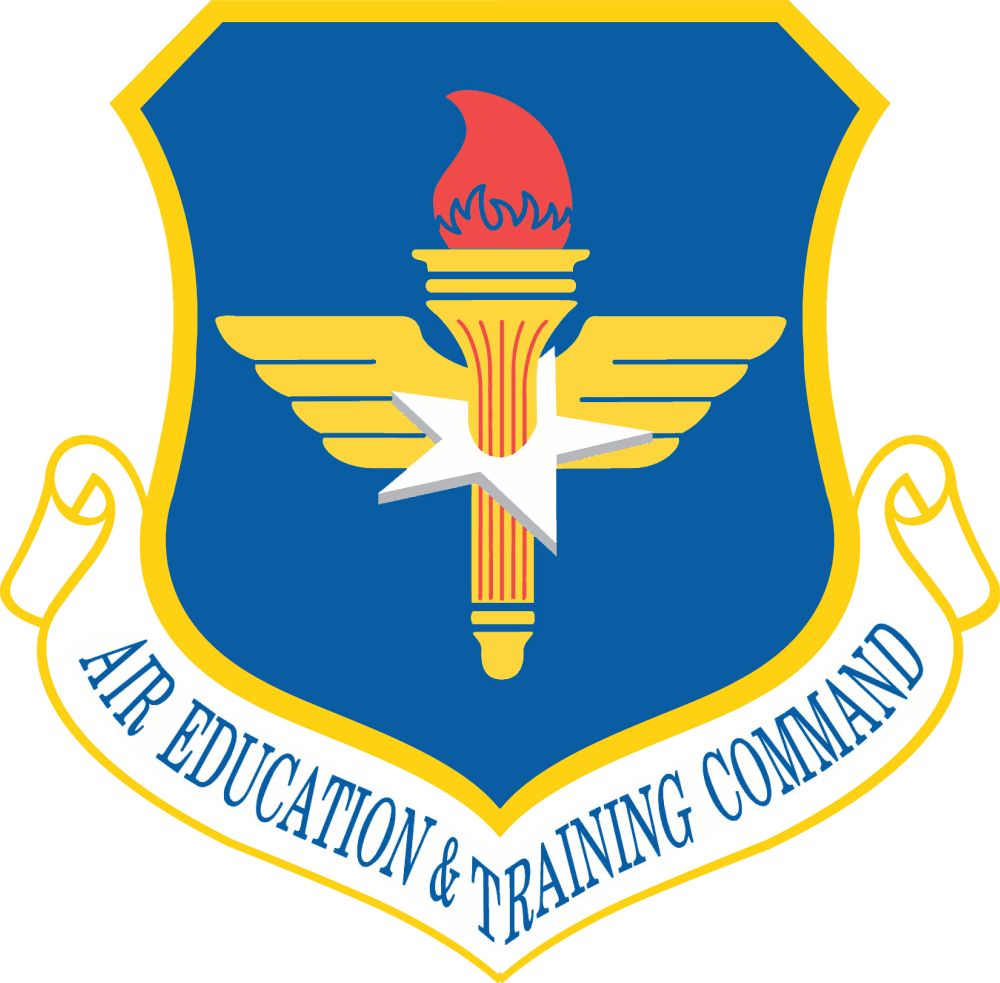
47th Operations Group

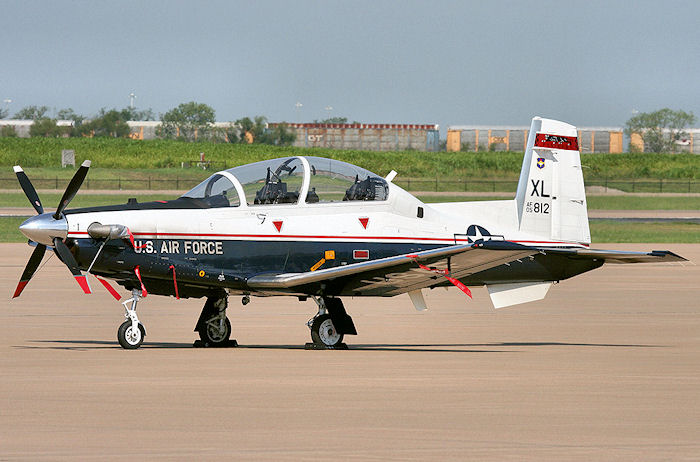
- 84th Flying Training Squadron T-6A Texan II
- Active: 1941–1949; 1951–1955; 1991–present
- Country: United States
- Branch: United States Air Force]
- Role: Training
- Part of: Air Education and Training Command
- Garrison/HQ: Laughlin Air Force Base, TX
- Engagements: Mediterranean Theater of Operations
- Decorations: Distinguished Unit Citation

Commanders
- Current commander: Col Joseph "Angry" McCane
- Notable commanders: Steven L. Kwast

Insignia
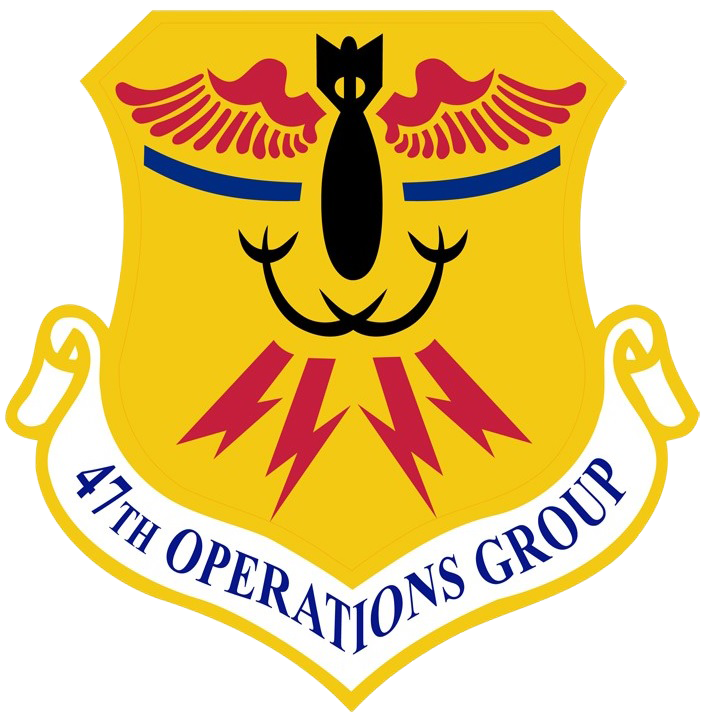
- 47th Operations Group emblem (Note: While assigned to the 47th Wing, the group uses the wing emblem with the group designation on the scroll. AF Instruction 84-105, Organizational Lineage, Honors and History, 27 April 2017, paragraph 3.3.3.)

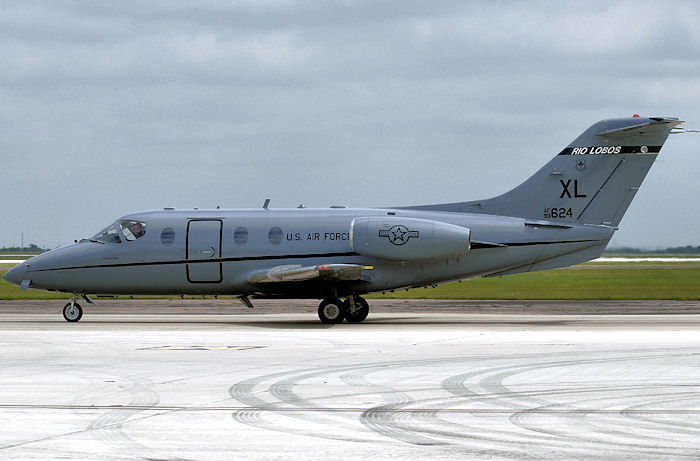
86th FTS Beechcraft T-1A Jayhawk 93-0624

The 47th Operations Group is the flying component of the 47th Flying Training Wing, assigned to the United States Air Force Air Education and Training Command. The group is stationed at Laughlin Air Force Base, Texas.

== Mission ==
The group contains five flying squadrons, one support squadron, and a maintenance flight. The Operations Group is responsible for training US Air Force and allied nation pilots under the Specialized Undergraduate Pilot Training Program.

The group provides management, control, and standardization/evaluation of all aspects of flying training operations, aircraft maintenance, and airfield management at Laughlin AFB, Texas.

== Components ==
Squadrons of the 47th Operations Group (Tail Code: XL) are:

- 47th Operations Support Squadron
- 434th Fighter Training Squadron, T-6 Texan II, Red Tail Stripe, "Red Devils"
- 85th Flying Training Squadron, T-6 Texan II, Yellow Tail Stripe, "Tigers"
- 86th Flying Training Squadron, T-1 Jayhawk, Black Tail Stripe, "Rio Lobos"
- 87th Flying Training Squadron, T-38 Talon, "Red Bulls"
- 96th Flying Training Squadron, T-1A, T-6, T-38 (AFRES)

== History ==
=== World War II ===
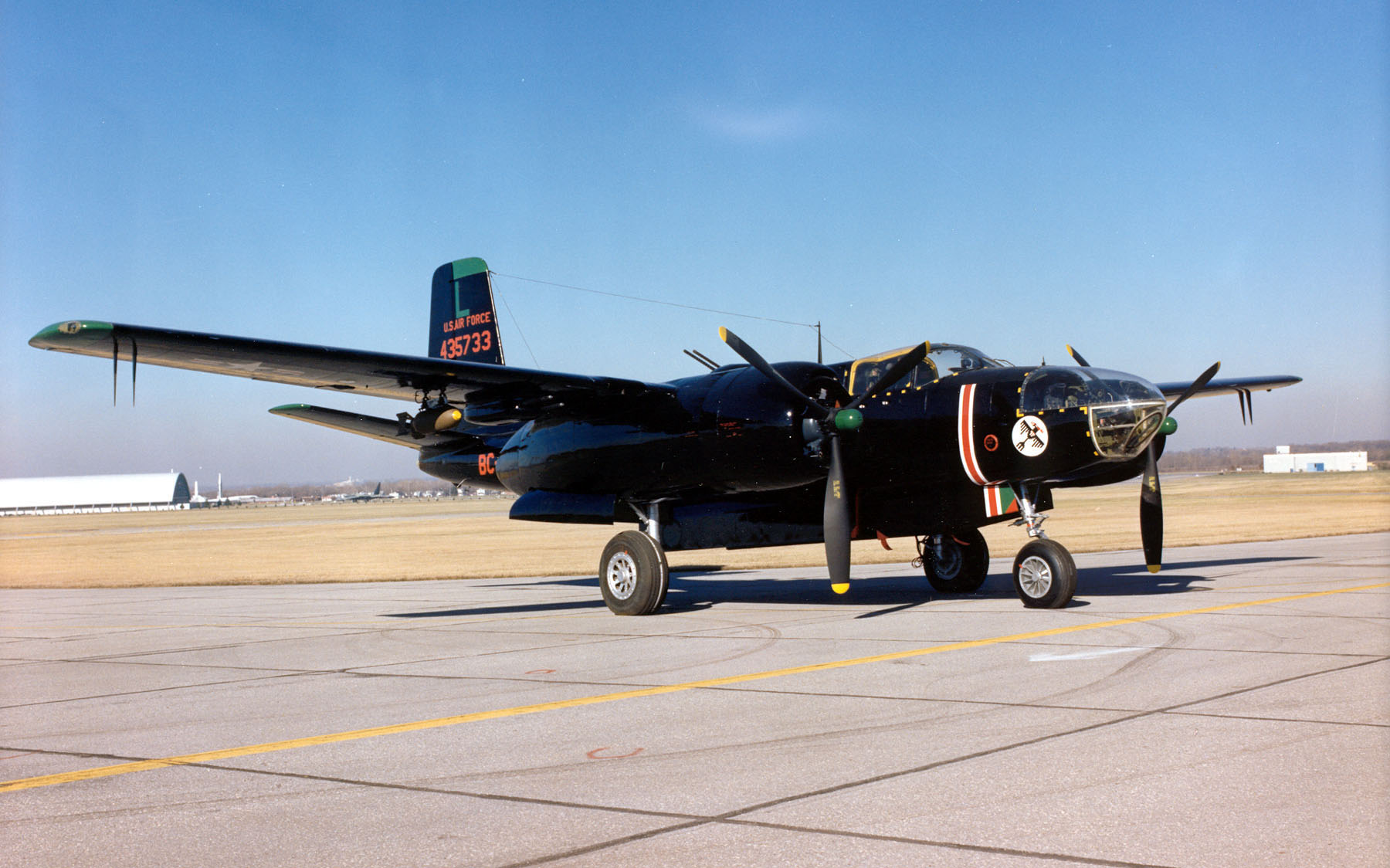
Douglas A-26C Invader (Later B-26C) flown by the 47th Bomb Group from early 1945 into the postwar era, before being replaced by the B-45 in 1948

The group was constituted as 47th Bombardment Group (Light) on 20 November 1940, and activated on 15 January 1941. Operational squadrons of the group were:

- 84th Bombardment Squadron 1941–1949
- 85th Bombardment Squadron 1941–1949
- 86th Bombardment Squadron 1941–1949
- 97th Bombardment Squadron 1941–1946

Initially stationed at McChord Field, Washington, the group's mission was to perform antisubmarine patrols along the Pacific coast with the Douglas B-18 Bolo as its primary aircraft. This was a short-lived mission, however, as after the Empire of Japan attacked Pearl Harbor, the group began training for duty overseas when it was assigned Douglas A-20C Havocs which were taken over by the Army Air Forces (AAF) from Lend-Lease contracts.

Training at several bases in the midwest and southeast, it was first believed that the 47th would be sent to the South Pacific Theater. However shortly after Operation Torch, the Allied invasion of North Africa, in November 1942, the 47th became the first AAF A-20 group to participate in large-scale combat in the North African Campaign, being assigned to Twelfth Air Force.

Flying to a former Vichy French Air Force base at Mediouna Airfield, French Morocco. the aircrews used ferry tanks on their A-20s to cross the North Atlantic. The group began operations by flying low-level missions against the enemy in North Africa flying its first combat mission from Youks-les-Bains Airfield, Algeria on 13 December 1942.

47th Group A-20s provided valuable tactical support to US and British ground forces, especially during and after the allied defeat at the Battle of the Kasserine Pass. Though undermanned and undersupplied, the group flew eleven missions on 22 February to attack the advancing Nazi armored columns and thus to help stop the enemy's offensive-an action which helped save the day, and eventually the Germans were forced back into a small perimeter in Tunisia. For these actions, the group was awarded a Distinguished Unit Citation (DUC).

The 47th remained active in combat during March and April 1943 while training for medium level bombardment. In 1943 the group was upgraded to the A-20G, which increased their forward firepower during low-level strafing missions. Moving to Malta, the group participated in the reduction of Pantelleria and Lampedusa (Operation Corkscrew) in June 1943 and the invasion of Sicily (Operation Husky) in July. The group also bombed German evacuation beaches near Messina in August.

The group supported the British Eighth Army during the invasion of Italy in September. Moving to Italy as part of the Italian Campaign, the group assisted the Allied advance toward Rome, September 1943 – June 1944 at the battles of the Bernhardt Line, Monte Cassino, and Operation Shingle. The 47th began flying numerous night intruder missions after June 1944, and supported Operation Dragoon, the invasion of Southern France from bases in Corsica and also in France during August–September 1944.

Returning to Italy, the group attacked German communications in northern Italy, 1 September – 4 April 1945. Received a second DUC for performance from to 21–24 April 1945 when, in bad weather and over rugged terrain, the group maintained operations for 60 consecutive hours, destroying enemy transportation in the Po Valley to prevent the organized withdrawal of German forces.

After January 1945, the 47th received some new Douglas A-26C Invaders which flew alongside its A-20s during the last four months of the war for specialized night attacks. The group flew support and interdictory operations attacking such targets as tanks, convoys, bivouac areas, troop concentrations, supply dumps, roads, pontoon bridges, rail lines, and airfields. The A-26 was regarded as being the USAAF's best twin-engined bomber, and plans were being made for the conversion of the 47th to the type.

The group returned to the United States in July 1945 and was atationed at Seymour Johnson Field, North Carolina. Its mission was to prepare for redeployment to the Central Pacific Ocean Areas for night pathfinder operations against Japan. Its black-painted A-26Cs were equipped with radar however the surrender by Japan in August 1945, cancelled all redeployment plans.

=== Postwar era ===
With the closing of Seymour Johnson in August 1945, the group moved to Lake Charles Army Air Field, Louisiana and was equipped with the Douglas A-26 Invader. (Note: Renamed B-26 in June 1948.) The A-26 was selected as the standard light bomber and night reconnaissance aircraft of the postwar USAAF, primarily as the maine light bomber of the Tactical Air Command which was created in 1946 out of the remnants of the wartime 9th and 12th Air Forces. At Lake Charles, the unit trained in night tactical operations, conducted firepower demonstrations, and participated in tactical exercises.

The group moved Biggs Field, Texas in October 1946 when Lake Charles became a Strategic Air Command (SAC) base. At Biggs, the Group was reduced from four to three tactical squadrons when the 97th Bombardment Squadron was inactivated. In August 1947, as the Air Force reorganized under the wing base organization, which placed tactical and support organizations on a base under a single wing commander, the group was reassigned to the 47th Bombardment Wing.

On 1 February 1948, Biggs was also turned over to SAC, forcing a relocation of the group to Barksdale Air Force Base, Louisiana in November. In the fall of 1948 North American B-45 Tornado bombers began to be delivered to the group, which became the first in the Air Force to fly the aircraft. The 47th was inactivated at Barksdale 2 October 1949 as a result of budgetary reductions. However the 84th and 85th Squadrons continued with the B-45's and moved to Langley Air Force Base, Virginia where they were attached to the 363d Tactical Reconnaissance Wing.

=== Cold War ===
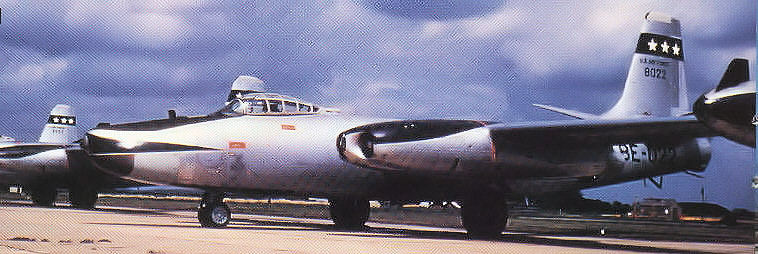
RB-45C 48-022, 19th Tactical Reconnaissance Squadron

On 12 March 1951, the group was reactivated at Langley, with the 84th and 85th Squadrons again assigned. The group was the only Jet-Medium Bomber Group in the Air Force. After becoming proficient in the handling and use of nuclear weapons, it moved to RAF Sculthorpe, United Kingdom where it began operations there on 1 June 1952.

For nearly three years, the 47th Bombardment Group provided an atomic air strike force to back up NATO ground forces in Europe. Operational missions of the group were training for tactical bombardment training operations, including participation in exercises and firepower demonstrations in support of NATO.

Owing to the small size of Sculthorpe, the group operated two B-45A jet bomber squadrons (84th and 85th) from Sculthorpe. In March 1954, a third B-45A jet bomber squadron (86th) was assigned to the wing, but operated from RAF Alconbury in order to accommodate the additional aircraft.

A few months after moving to England that year, the group ceased operations and remained a paper organization until inactivation again in 1955 as a result of the Air Force dual deputate reorganization.

=== Modern era ===
The group was reactivated on 9 December 1991 as the 47th Operations Group and assigned to the 47th Flying Training Wing as part of the Objective Wing organizationt adopted by the Air Force.

The group was assigned the flying components of the wing, and since its reactivation has USAF and Allied pilots using various types of trainer aircraft.

== Lineage ==
- Constituted as the 47th Bombardment Group (Light)' on 20 November 1940

Activated on 15 January 1941
Redesignated 47th Bombardment Group, Light on 20 August 1943
Redesignated 47th Bombardment Group, Light (Night Attack) on 1 May 1946
Redesignated 47th Bombardment Group, Light on 22 August 1948
Inactivated on 2 October 1949

- Activated on 12 March 1951

Inactivated on 8 February 1955

- Redesignated 47th Operations Group on 9 December 1991

Activated on 15 December 1991

=== Assignments ===
- General Headquarters Air Force (later, Air Force Combat Command), 15 January 1941 (attached to: Northwest Air District (later Second Air Force))
- 15th Bombardment Wing (Light), 14 August 1941
- IV Air Support Command, 1 September 1941 (attached to IV Bomber Command after 17 December 1941)
- Second Air Force, 15 February 1942
- III Bomber Command, 1 May 1942 (attached to III Ground Air Support Command after 29 June 1942)
- III Ground Air Support Command, 10 August 1942
- XII Air Support Command, 27 September 1942

Moroccan Composite Wing, 31 December 1942

- XII Air Support Command, 22 January 1943
- Twelfth Air Force, 18 February 1943 (attached to Northwest African Tactical Air Force until 20 March 1943, Northwest African Tactical Bomber Force until 1 September 1943, XII Air Support Command until 6 October 1943, 57th Bombardment Wing [Medium] until 10 December 1943, XII Air Support Command (later XII Tactical Air Command) until 20 July 1944, 87th Fighter Wing until 7 September 1944, XII Tactical Air Command, until 15 September 1944, XII Fighter Command (later XXII Tactical Air Command), 15 September 1944 – 7 June 1945)
- I Bomber Command, 11 July 1945
- Third Air Force, 7 February 1946
- Tactical Air Command, 21 March 1946
- Ninth Air Force, 29 May 1946
- Twelfth Air Force, 1 November 1946
- 47th Bombardment Wing, 15 August 1947 – 2 October 1949
- 47th Bombardment Wing, 12 March 1951 – 8 February 1955
- 47th Flying Training Wing, 15 December 1991 – present

=== Components ===
- 20th Reconnaissance Squadron (later 97th Bombardment Squadron): attached 15 January-14 August 1941, assigned 14 August 1941 – 31 March 1946
- 84th Bombardment Squadron: 15 January 1941 – 2 October 1949; 12 March 1951 – 8 February 1955 (detached 17 November 1952 – 8 February 1955)
- 84th Flying Training Squadron: 15 December 1991 – 1 October 1992; 1 October 1998 – present
- 85th Bombardment Squadron (later 85th Flying Training Squadron): 15 January 1941 – 2 October 1949; 12 March 1951 – 8 February 1955 (detached 17 November 1952 – 8 February 1955); 15 December 1991–present
- 86th Bombardment Squadron (later 86th Flying Training Squadron): 15 January 1941 – 2 October 1949; 23 March 1954 – 8 February 1955 (detached 23 March 1954 – 8 February 1955); 15 December 1991 – 15 September 1992; 1 December 1993 – present
- 87th Flying Training Squadron: 15 December 1991 – present
- 97th Bombardment Squadron: 8 May-13 August 1941; 14 August 1941 – 31 March 1946
- 115th Bombardment Squadron: attached 17 May 1951 – 12 February 1952
- 422d Bombardment Squadron: 8 February - 23 March 1954 (detached 8 February - 23 March 1954)
- 434th Fighter Training Squadron: 19 July 2007 – present

=== Stations ===
- McChord Field, Washington, 15 January 1941
- Hammer Field, California, 14 August 1941
- Will Rogers Field, Oklahoma, c. 16 February 1942
- Greensboro Airport, North Carolina, c. 16 July-18 October 1942
- Mediouna Airfield, French Morocco, 18 November 1942
- Youks-les-Bains Airfield, Algeria, 7 January 1943
- Canrobert Airfield, Algeria, 6 March 1943
- Thelepte Airfield, Tunisia, 30 March 1943
- Souk-el-Arba Airfield, Tunisia, 13 April 1943
- Soliman Airfield, Tunisia, c. 1 July 1943
- Ta' Qali Airfield, Malta, 21 July 1943
- Torrente Comunelli Airfield, Sicily, Italy, 9 August 1943
- Gerbini Airfield, Sicily, Italy, 20 August 1943
- Grottaglie Airfield, Italy, 24 September 1943
- Vincenzo Airfield, Italy, 15 October 1943
- Vesuvius Airfield, Italy, c. 10 January 1944
- Capodichino Airport (Naples), Italy, 22 March 1944
- Vesuvius Airfield, Italy, 25 April 1944
- Ponte Galeria Airfield, Italy, c. 10 June 1944
- Ombrone Airfield, Italy, 27 June 1944
- Poretta Airfield, Corsica, France, 11 July 1944
- Salon de Provence Airfield (Y-16), France, 7 September 1944
- Follonica Airfield, Italy, 18 September 1944
- Rosignano Airfield, Italy, October 1944
- Grosseto Airfield, Italy, 11 December 1944
- Pisa Airfield, Italy, 20–24 June 1945
- Seymour Johnson Field, North Carolina, 14 July 1945
- Lake Charles Army Air Field, Louisiana, c. 9 September 1945
- Biggs Field (later Biggs Air Force Base), Texas, 20 October 1946
- Barksdale Air Force Base, Louisiana, 19 November 1948 – 2 October 1949
- Langley Air Force Base, Virginia, 12 March 1951 – 21 May 1952
- Sculthorpe RAF Station (later, RAF Sculthorpe), England, 1 June 1952 – 8 February 1955
- Laughlin Air Force Base, Texas, 15 December 1991–present

=== Aircraft assigned ===
- Primarily Douglas B-18 Bolo, but included DB-7 Boston and LB-30 Liberator, 1941–1942
- Douglas A-20 Havoc, 1941–1945
- Douglas A-26 (later B-26) Invader, 1945–1949
- North American B-45 Tornado, 1949
- Primarily B-45 Tornado, 1951–1952, but included Douglas B-26 Invader and F-84 Thunderstreak, 1951
- Cessna T-37 Tweet, 1972–2004
- Northrop T-38 Talon, 1972–present
- T-1 Jayhawk, 1993–2024
- T-6 Texan II, 2002–present
- T-7 Red Hawk, 2030
