= John W. Doucette =

United States Air Force general

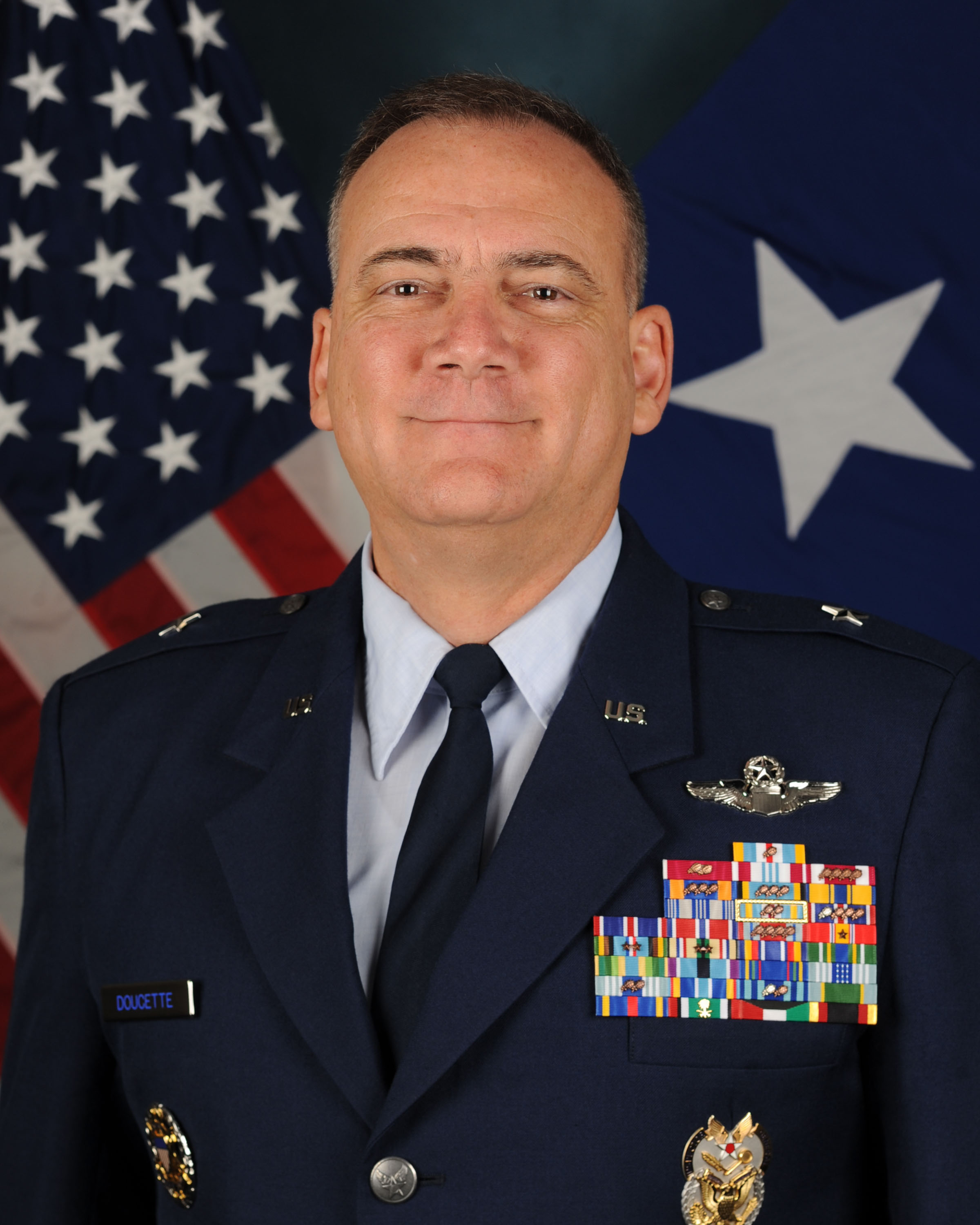
John W. Doucette in 2015

John W. Doucette is a retired brigadier general of the United States Air Force (USAF).

== Career ==
Doucette trained from 1987 to 1989 at Sheppard Air Force Base, Holloman AFB and Tyndall AFB. After the completion of his training, he was assigned to the 1st Fighter Wing at Langley Air Force Base. During that time, he was deployed to serve in the Gulf War flying the F-15 Eagle.

In 1992, Doucette returned to Holloman AFB as an instructor pilot and flight commander with the 435th Fighter Squadron. He remained there until he assigned as Chief of Readiness of the 48th Fighter Wing and an assistant operations officer with the 493d Fighter Squadron at RAF Lakenheath in England.

In 1999, Doucette was named deputy chief of the Commander's Action Group and chief of senior officer management at Air Combat Command. From there, he served in multiple roles, including chief of safety of the 18th Wing and deputy commander of the 18th Operations Group at Kadena Air Base in Japan.

After his return to the United States, Doucette was assigned to The Pentagon in the Office of the Joint Chiefs of Staff. In 2007, he was named vice commander of the 33rd Fighter Wing at Eglin AFB. Later that year, he was assumed command of the 47th Flying Training Wing at Laughlin AFB. He remained in that position until 2009, when he returned to The Pentagon as an assistant to the Director of the Joint Staff. The following year, he assumed command of the 36th Wing at Andersen AFB, where he simultaneously was named Base Commanding Officer, as well as deputy commander of Joint Region Marianas. He became the Deputy Commander and Chief of Staff for NATO's Joint Warfare Centre (JWC) on 24 July 2012. Doucette retired from the USAF on 1 October 2015.

Awards he has received include the Defense Superior Service Medal, the Legion of Merit, the Defense Meritorious Service Medal, the Meritorious Service Medal with four oak leaf clusters, the Air Medal with three oak leaf clusters, the Aerial Achievement Medal with three oak leaf clusters, the Air Force Commendation Medal and the Southwest Asia Service Medal with two service stars.

== Education ==
- Oklahoma State University–Stillwater
- Squadron Officer School
- Air Command and Staff College
- Air War College
- Industrial College of the Armed Forces – National Defense University
