= 47th Flying Training Wing =

47th Flying Training Wing

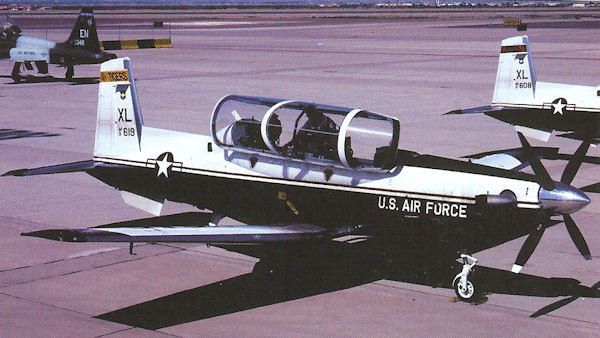
- T-6 Texan IIs of the 47th Flying Training Wing
- Active: 1947–1949; 1951–1962; 1972–present
- Country: United States
- Branch: United States Air Force
- Role: Pilot Training
- Size: Wing
- Part of: Air Education & Training Command
- Garrison/HQ: Laughlin Air Force Base
- Decorations: Air Force Outstanding Unit Award

Commanders
- Current commander: Colonel Eric Bissonette
- Vice Commander: Colonel Ivan Blackwell
- Command Chief: Chief Master Sergeant Erik J. Garza
- Notable commanders: Donald G. Cook; John W. Doucette

Insignia
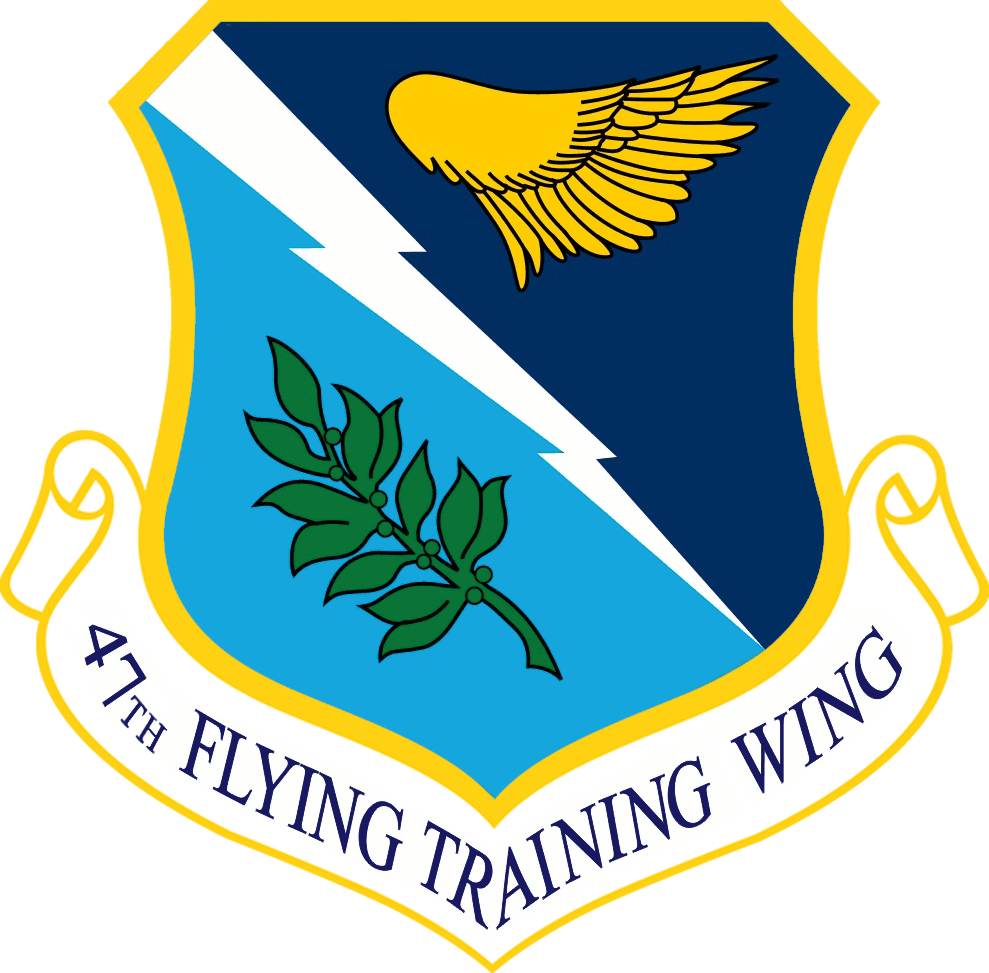
- 47th Flying Training Wing emblem (approved 2 January 1973)

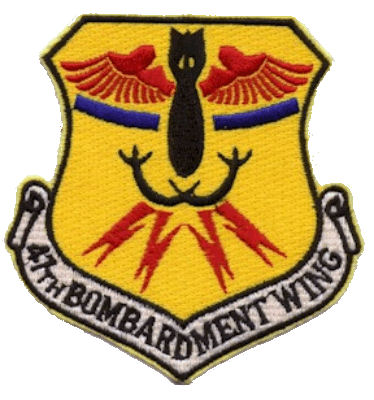
- Patch with 47th Bombardment Wing emblem (approved 26 October 1951)

The 47th Flying Training Wing is a United States Air Force pilot training wing based at Laughlin Air Force Base, near Del Rio, Texas. It is one of five pilot training units in the Air Force's Air Education and Training Command which conducts joint specialized undergraduate pilot training for the United States Air Force, Air Force Reserve, Air National Guard and allied nation air forces utilizing the T-38C, T-6A and T-1A aircraft.

== History ==
The original 47th Bombardment Group was activated on 15 January 1941, fighting in Europe during World War II.

=== Light bombardment operations in the United States ===
On 28 July 1947, the 47th Bombardment Wing was established as part of the Army Air Forces' implementation of the wing base reorganization, which combined tactical and support elements on its bases into a single wing. The wing became active on 15 August 1947 at Biggs Field, Texas, with the 47th Bombardment Group as its operational unit. On 1 February 1948 Biggs was turned over to Strategic Air Command, forcing a relocation of the wing to Barksdale Air Force Base, Louisiana in November. In the fall of 1948 North American B-45 Tornado bombers began to be delivered to the wing, which became the first in the Air Force to fly the aircraft. However, the B-45As were not truly operational, because they lacked both fire control and bombing equipment.

The Air Force planned to equip five groups with the B-45, but in programming the units that would comprise its forty-eight group structure authorized in 1948, the number of light bombardment groups flying the B-45 was reduced to one. With this reduction, the Air Force decided to inactivate the 47th wing and transfer its B-45s to the 3d Bombardment Wing in Japan. However, the first B-45As delivered to the wing lacked sufficient range to ferry across the Pacific and they were too large to send on board available ships. The additional high cost of maintaining its B-45 aircraft led the Air Force to inactivate the 47th on 2 October 1949. However, the 84th and 85th squadrons of the 47th Bombardment Group kept their B-45s and moved to Langley Air Force Base, Virginia where they were attached to the 363d Tactical Reconnaissance Wing.

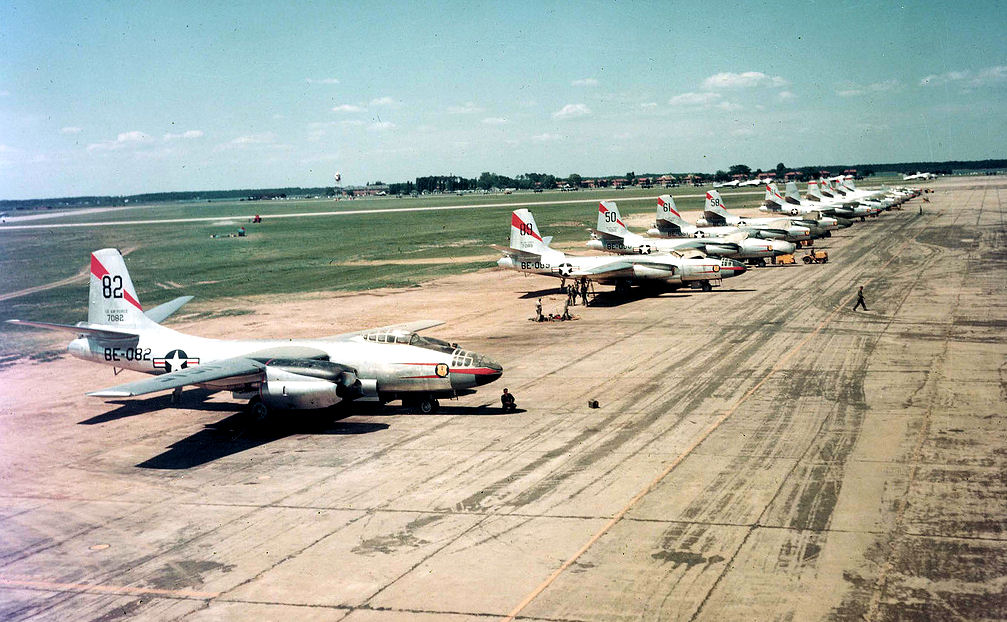
Flightline photo of B-45A-5-NA Tornadoes of the 47th Light Bomb Wing, Langley Air Force Base, Va., before trans-atlantic flight to Sculthorpe, England, in July 1952.

On 12 March 1951, the 47th wing and group were reactivated at Langley, along with a number of support organizations to join the 84th and 85th Bombardment Squadrons. The wing was assigned to Tactical Air Command (TAC).

=== European operations ===
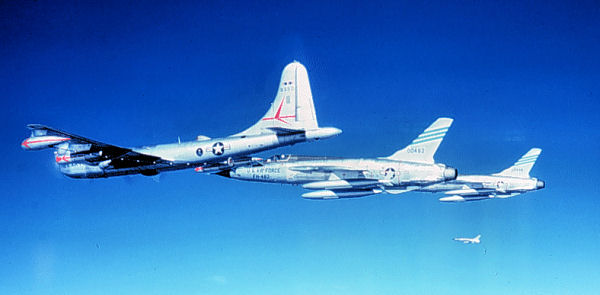
KB-50J of the 420th Air Refueling Squadron refueling 2 Republic F-105D's from the 36th TFW, Bitburg AB West Germany.

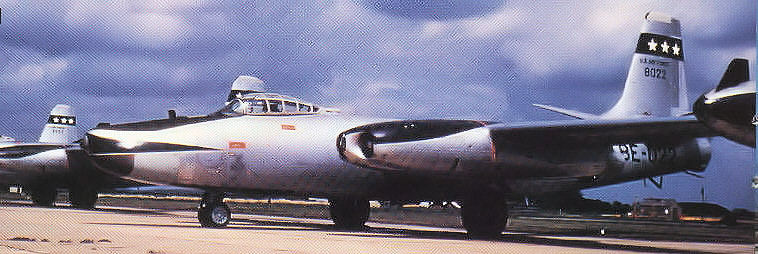
RB-45C 48-022, 19th Tactical Reconnaissance Squadron

After becoming proficient in the handling and use of nuclear weapons, the wing moved to RAF Sculthorpe, United Kingdom where it began operations there on 1 June 1952. Operational squadrons of the wing included the 84th, 85th, and 86th Bombardment Squadrons.

In 1962 Project Clearwater halted large scale bomber deployments to Britain. Sculthorpe, along with RAF Fairford, RAF Chelveston, and RAF Greenham Common, was turned over to the British Air Ministry. This resulted in the 47th Bomb Wing being inactivated on 22 June 1962.

=== Pilot training ===
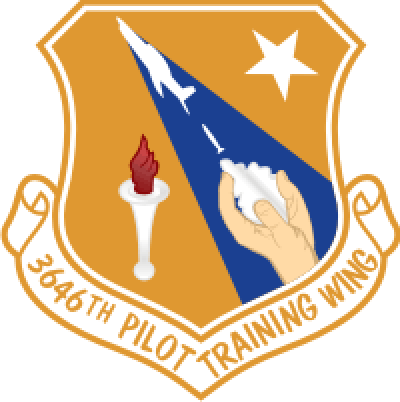
3646th Pilot Training Wing emblem

The 47th Flying Training Wing was reactivated and redesignated at Laughlin Air Force Base, Texas on 1 September 1972, replacing and absorbing the resources of the 3646th Pilot Training Wing. Since its reactivation, the wing has conducted undergraduate pilot training for USAF, Air Force Reserve, and friendly foreign nation air forces. It supported Accelerated Co-Pilot Enrichment Program at numerous locations, 1976–1986. Began airlifter-tanker track pilot training in 1994.

Units in the mid-2020s include:

- 47th Operations Group (Tail Code: XL)
  - 47th Operations Support Squadron
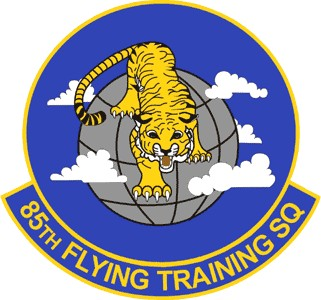
  - 85th Flying Training Squadron (T-6A) "Tigers"
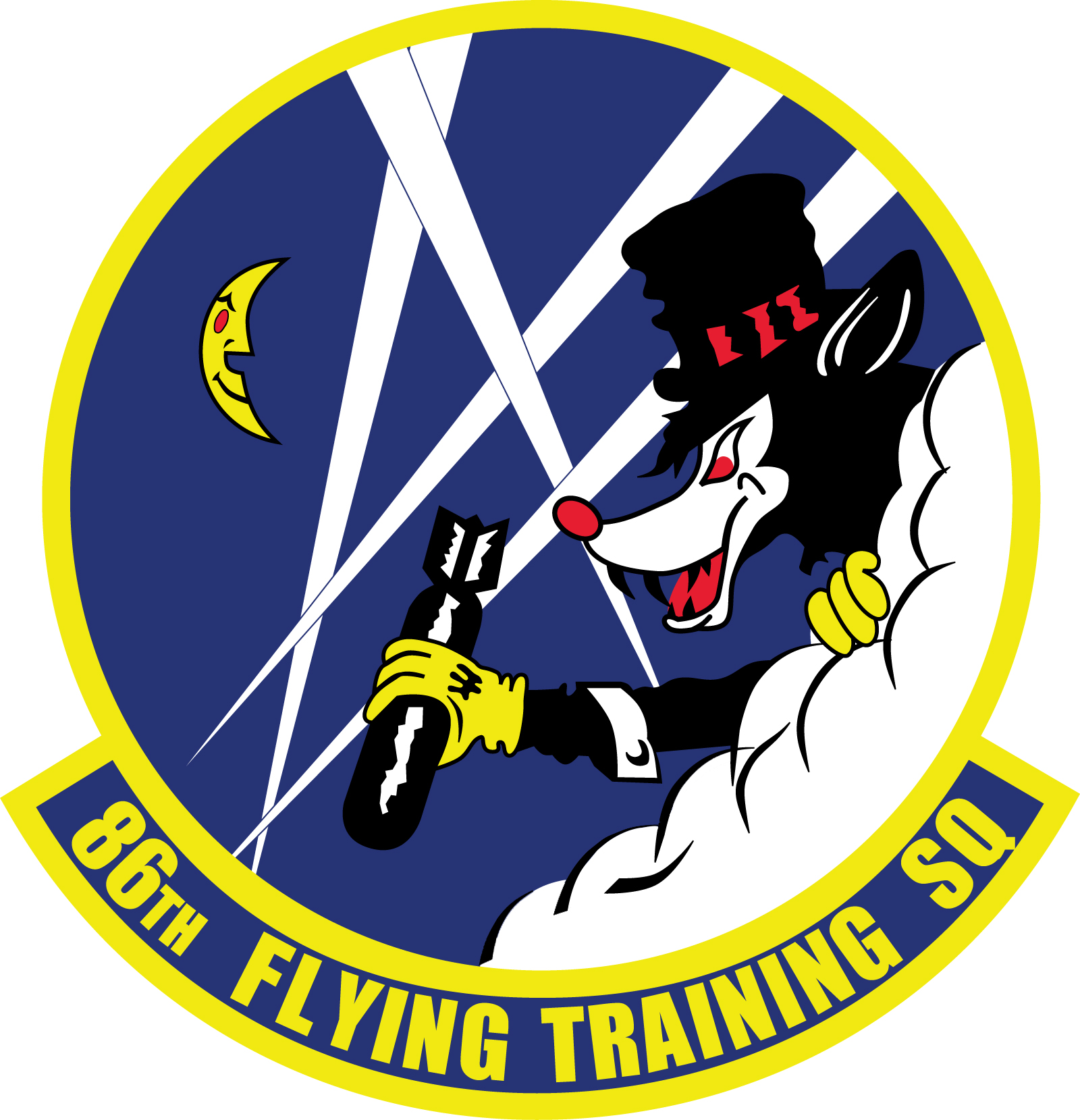
  - 86th Flying Training Squadron (T-1A) "Rio Lobos"
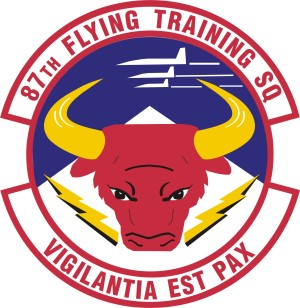
  - 87th Flying Training Squadron (T-38C) "Red Bulls"
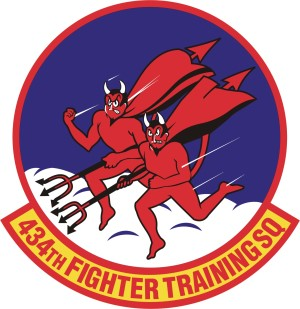
  - 434th Flying Training Squadron (T-6A) "Red Devils"
- 47th Mission Support Group
  - 47th Security Forces Squadron "Amistad Defenders"
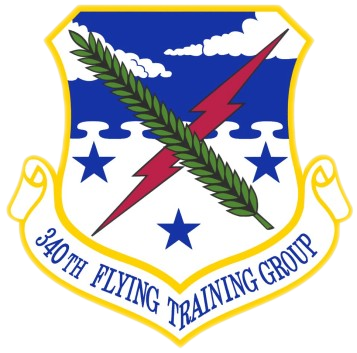
- 340th Flying Training Group (AFRC)
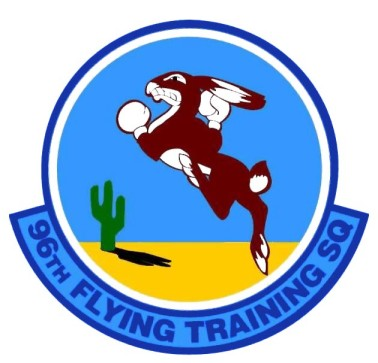
  - 96th Flying Training Squadron (T-38C, T-1A)

== Aircraft flown ==
- T-41 Mescalero, 1972–1973
- T-37 Tweet, 1972–2004
- T-38 Talon, 1972–present
- T-1 Jayhawk, 1993–2024
- T-6 Texan II, 2002–present
- T-7 Red Hawk, 2030

== Lineage ==
- Designated as 47th Bombardment Wing, Light on 28 July 1947

Organized on 15 August 1947
Inactivated on 2 October 1949

- Activated on 12 March 1951

Redesignated 47th Bombardment Wing, Tactical on 1 October 1955
Discontinued and inactivated on 22 June 1962

- Redesignated 47th Flying Training Wing on 22 March 1972

Activated on 1 September 1972

=== Assignments ===
- Twelfth Air Force, 15 August 1947 – 2 October 1949
- Tactical Air Command, 12 March 1951 (attached to 49th Air Division 12 February 1952)
- Third Air Force, 5 June 1952 (remained attached to 49th Air Division to 1 July 1956)
- Seventeenth Air Force, 1 July 1961 – 22 June 1962
- Air Training Command, 1 September 1972
- Nineteenth Air Force, 1 July 1993 – present

=== Components ===
Wing

- 392d Bombardment Wing: attached 27 June 1949 – 2 October 1949

Groups

- 47th Bombardment Group (later 47th Operations Group): 15 August 1947 – 2 October 1949; 12 March 1951 – 8 February 1955; 15 December 1991 – present
- 4400th Combat Crew Training Group: attached 12 March 1951 – 12 February 1952

Squadrons

- 19th Tactical Reconnaissance Squadron: attached 7 May 1954 – 1 December 1956
- 39th Flying Training Squadron: 2 April 1990 – 15 December 1991
- 84th Bombardment Squadron: attached 17 November 1952 – 7 February 1955, assigned 8 February 1955 – 22 June 1962
- 84th Flying Training Squadron: 2 April 1990 – 15 December 1991
- 85th Bombardment Squadron (later 85th Flying Training Squadron): attached 17 November 1952 – 7 February 1955, assigned 8 February 1955 – 22 June 1962; assigned 1 September 1972 – 15 December 1991
- 86th Bombardment (later, 86th Flying Training) Squadron: attached 23 March 1954 – 7 February 1955, assigned 8 February 1955 – 22 June 1962; assigned 1 September 1972 – 15 December 1991
- 87th Flying Training Squadron: 2 April 1990 – 15 December 1991
- 420th Air Refueling Squadron: attached 15 March 1960 – 7 November 1961, assigned 8 November 1961 – 22 June 1962
- 422d Bombardment Squadron: attached 20 December 1953 – 23 March 1954.

=== Stations ===
- Biggs Field (later Biggs Air Force Base), Texas, 15 August 1947 – 19 November 1948
- Barksdale Air Force Base, Louisiana, 19 November 1948 – 2 October 1949
- Langley Air Force Base, Virginia, 12 March 1951 – 21 May 1952
- RAF Sculthorpe, England, 1 June 1952 – 22 June 1962
- Laughlin Air Force Base, Texas, 1 September 1972 – present
