= Laughlin Air Force Base =

US Air Force base near Del Rio, Texas

- Near Del Rio, Texas in United States of America
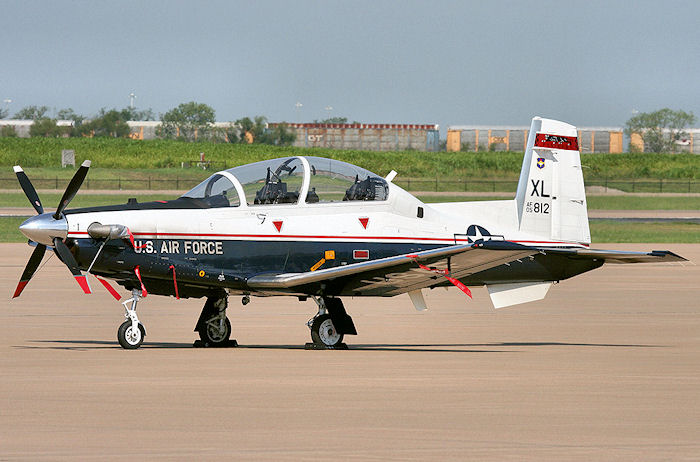
- A Beechcraft T-6 Texan II of the 47th Flying Training Wing based at Laughlin AFB, Texas

Site information
- Type: US Air Force base
- Owner: Department of Defense
- Operator: US Air Force
- Controlled by: Air Education and Training Command (AETC)
- Condition: Operational
- Website: www.laughlin.af.mil

Location
- Location within North America Location within the United States Location within Texas
- Coordinates: 29°21′34″N 100°46′41″W

Site history
- Built: 1943 (as Laughlin Army Air Field)
- In use: 1943 – present

Garrison information
- Current commander: Colonel Tyler Ellison
- Garrison: 47th Flying Training Wing (Host)

Airfield information
- Identifiers: IATA: DLF, ICAO: KDLF, FAA LID: DLF, WMO: 722615
- Elevation: 329.4 metres (1,081 ft) AMSL
Runways
Direction	Length and surface
13C/31C	2,698 metres (8,852 ft) Asphalt
13L/31R	2,534.4 metres (8,315 ft) Porous European Mix
13R/31L	2,002.8 metres (6,571 ft) Asphalt

Laughlin Air Force Base (IATA: DLF, ICAO: KDLF, FAA LID: DLF) is a facility of the United States Air Force located east of Del Rio, Texas.

== Overview ==
Laughlin AFB, the largest pilot-training base in the U.S. Air Force (USAF), is home to the 47th Flying Training Wing of the Air Education and Training Command and the 96th Flying Training Squadron of the Air Force Reserve Command. On weekdays, the airfield has more takeoffs and landings than any other airport in the country.

== History ==
=== Laughlin Army Air Field ===
Laughlin Army Air Field photo pictorial

Laughlin AFB was originally named Laughlin Army Air Field on March 3, 1943, after Jack T. Laughlin, a B-17E Flying Fortress pilot. He was trained as a pilot and was actually co-pilot of B-17E, tail number 41-2476. On the day of his first bombing mission, he was bumped by the Group Commander Major Stanley K. Robinson (Robinson was co-pilot next to pilot Capt. Walter W. Sparks). Major Robinson brought along his own combat-experienced navigator, Lt. Richard Cease. Laughlin had no assigned position on the plane for the mission. He became Del Rio's first World War II casualty when the plane in which he was flying (most likely as a waist gunner for the mission) was lost at sea, having succumbed to damage received over the Makassar Strait on 29 (or 28) January 1942. The damage occurred during two bombing runs against Japanese warships and transports in the Makassar Strait off the coast of Balikpapan, Borneo. The field became simply Laughlin Field on November 11, 1943, and later an U.S. Army Air Forces Auxiliary Field. During World War II, Laughlin's primary mission was the training of B-26 Marauder pilots and aircrews. It was closed in October 1945.

=== Laughlin Air Force Base ===
Laughlin Air Force Base reopened on May 1, 1952. In October 1952, Air Training Command (ATC) transferred the base to the Crew Training Air Force and activated the 3645th Flying Training Wing (Fighter), as a combat crew replacement training facility for pilots headed for Korea. Training provided new pilots with basic bombing and gunnery combat skills in the F-80 Shooting Star, F-84 Thunderjet, and T-33 jet aircraft, but within short time, crews used only the T-33. In September 1955, Laughlin came under the control of the Flying Training Air Force and switched missions with Williams Air Force Base, Arizona. Laughlin undertook single-engined plane pilot training, still using the T-33.

==== Strategic Air Command ====
The USAF transferred jurisdiction of the base to the Strategic Air Command on April 1, 1957, and the 4080th Strategic Reconnaissance Wing (Light) moved there from Turner Air Force Base, Georgia. Following the graduation of the last class in March 1957, ATC inactivated the 3645th FTW. The 4080th Wing provided high-altitude reconnaissance and air sampling using the Lockheed U-2A and the RB-57D Canberra. The 4080th Strategic Reconnaissance Wing was redesignated as the 4080th Strategic Wing on June 15, 1960, and the RB-57 mission was phased out.

Laughlin U-2s were among the first to provide photographic evidence of Soviet missile installations in Cuba in 1962 when 4080th U-2 pilot major Steve Heyser flew his U-2C over Cuba after taking off from Edwards AFB, California. Heyser landed at McCoy AFB, Florida, following the mission, with McCoy becoming a U-2 operating location for the duration of the Cuban Missile Crisis. The film from Major Heyser's mission was developed and analyzed, and the photos were shown to the United Nations Security Council on October 22, 1962, proving to the world that offensive missiles were on the island of Cuba.

Another 4080th pilot, Major Rudolf Anderson, Jr., perished when his U-2 was hit by shrapnel from a Soviet-made SA-2 surface-to-air missile on October 22, 1962, while overflying Cuba from McCoy AFB. While the U-2 did not suffer a direct hit, Anderson was struck by fragments from the proximity fused warhead's explosion, which penetrated and compromised his pressure suit (at altitude, unconsciousness and death came very quickly). His body was returned to the U.S. following the crisis, still clad in its pressure suit. Major Anderson posthumously became the first recipient of the Air Force Cross. Laughlin's primary operations training complex, Anderson Hall, is named in his honor.

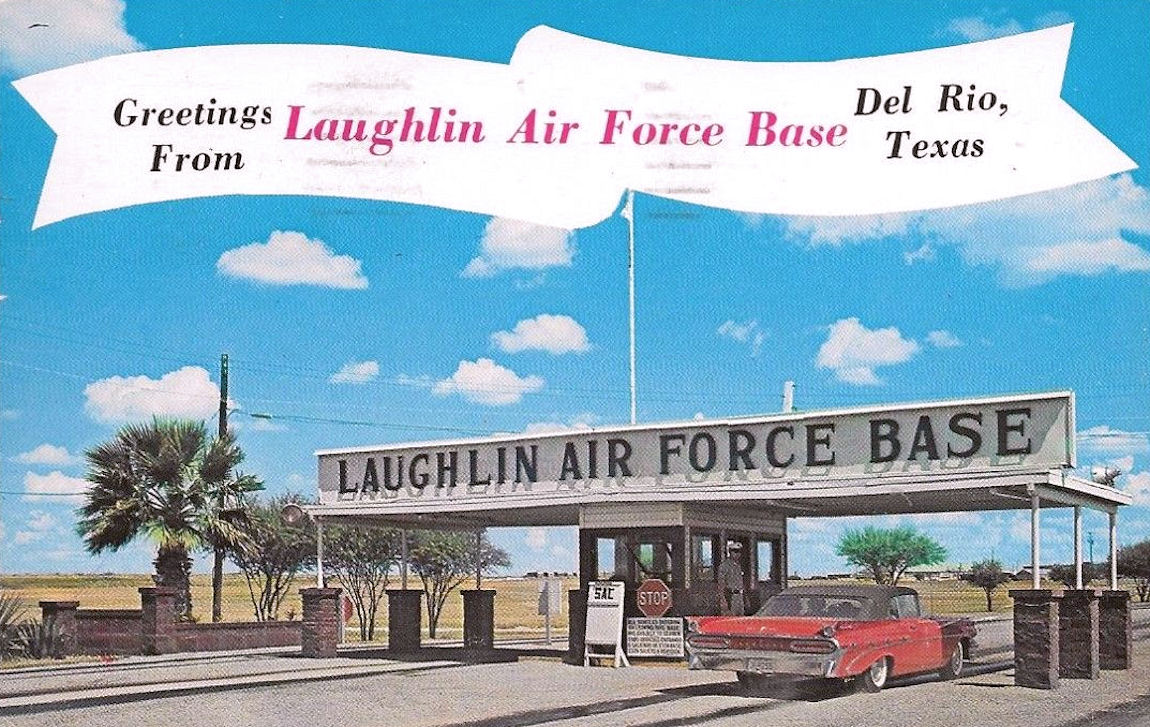
1972, Main Gate

==== Air Training Command ====
In 1961, Headquarters USAF notified Laughlin officials their mission would expand to again include an ATC undergraduate pilot-training program. Plans were to transfer in about half the student load from Laredo Air Force Base, Texas. ATC reactivated the 3645th Pilot Training Wing (later redesignated 3646th Pilot Training Wing) at Laughlin in October 1961 to prepare for the phase-in of students and T-37 and T-33 trainers. The 4080th SW continued at Laughlin as a tenant organization until 1963.

Today, aircraft flown at Laughlin include the T-6A Texan II, the T-38C Talon, and T-1A Jayhawk. Fifteen classes of approximately 20–25 pilots graduate annually.

== Based units ==
Flying and notable nonflying units based at Laughlin Air Force Base:

=== United States Air Force ===
Air Education and Training Command (AETC)

- 47th Flying Training Wing
  - 47th Comptroller Squadron
  - 47th Operations Group
    - 47th Operations Support Squadron
    - 47th Student Squadron
    - 85th Flying Training Squadron – T-6A Texan II
    - 86th Flying Training Squadron – T-1A Jayhawk
    - 87th Flying Training Squadron – T-38C Talon
    - 434th Flying Training Squadron – T-6A Texan II
  - 47th Medical Group
    - 47th Medical Operations Squadron
    - 47th Medical Support Squadron
  - 47th Mission Support Group
    - 47th Communications Squadron
    - 47th Contracting Flight
    - 47th Civil Engineering Squadron
    - 47th Force Support Squadron
    - 47th Logistics Readiness Flight
    - 47th Security Forces Squadron

Air Force Reserve Command

- Tenth Air Force
  - 340th Flying Training Group
    - 96th Flying Training Squadron (GSU) – T-1A Jayhawk, T-6A Texan II, T-38C Talon (GSUs are geographically separate units, which although based at Laughlin, are subordinate to a parent unit based at another location.)

== Geography ==
According to the United States Census Bureau, the base has a total area of 5.9 square miles (15.3 km^{2}), all land.

== Demographics ==
Historical population
Census	Pop.	Note	%±
1970	3,458		—
1980	2,994		−13.4%
1990	2,556		−14.6%
2000	2,225		−12.9%
2010	1,569		−29.5%
2020	1,673		6.6%
U.S. Decennial Census; 1850–1900 1910; 1920 1930 1940; 1950 1960 1970; 1980 1990 2000; 2010 2020

The U.S. Census Bureau counts the base as a census-designated place (Laughlin AFB CDP) with a population at the 2020 census of 1,673. It first appeared as an unincorporated community in the 1970 U.S. census and a census designated place in the 1980 United States census.

Laughlin AFB CDP, Texas – Racial and ethnic composition Note: the US Census treats Hispanic/Latino as an ethnic category. This table excludes Latinos from the racial categories and assigns them to a separate category. Hispanics/Latinos may be of any race.
Race / Ethnicity (NH = Non-Hispanic)	Pop 1990	Pop 2000	Pop 2010	Pop 2020	% 1990	% 2000	% 2010	% 2020
White alone (NH)	1,790	1,581	1,178	1,183	70.03%	71.06%	75.08%	70.71%
Black or African American alone (NH)	286	236	112	107	11.19%	10.61%	7.14%	6.40%
Native American or Alaska Native alone (NH)	16	5	8	2	0.63%	0.22%	0.51%	0.12%
Asian alone (NH)	97	61	40	63	3.79%	2.74%	2.55%	3.77%
Native Hawaiian or Pacific Islander alone (NH)	x	1	5	5	x	0.04%	0.32%	0.30%
Other race alone (NH)	2	12	0	5	0.08%	0.54%	0.00%	0.30%
Multiracial (NH)	x	55	54	55	x	2.47%	3.44%	3.29%
Hispanic or Latino (any race)	365	274	172	253	14.28%	12.31%	10.96%	15.12%
Total	2,556	2,225	1,569	1,673	100.00%	100.00%	100.00%	100.00%

== Education ==
Laughlin AFB is served by the San Felipe Del Rio Consolidated Independent School District. Laughlin Air Force Base is home to an on-post elementary school, the Roberto Barrera STEM Elementary school (K–5) (formerly known as Laughlin STEM elementary school).

Park University offers onsite and online classes on base. Its office is located at the Education Center and is open to military and civilian personnel.

== See also ==
- List of United States Air Force installations
- Texas World War II Army Airfields
