= Torrente Comunelli Airfield =

Former airfield in Italy

Torrente Comunelli Airfield
- Part of Twelfth Air Force

Site information
- Type: Military airfield
- Controlled by: United States Army Air Forces

Location
- Coordinates: 37°05′32.07″N 014°11′57.18″E

Site history
- Built: 1943
- In use: 1943

Location of Torrente Comunelli Airfield, Italy

Torrente Comunelli Airfield is an abandoned World War II military airfield in Sicily, located 5 km west-northwest of Gela, approximately 140 km southeast of Palermo.

It was an all-weather temporary field built by the XII Engineer Command using a graded earth compacted surface, with a prefabricated hessian (burlap) surfacing known as PHS. PHS was made of an asphalt-impregnated jute which was rolled out over the compacted surface over a square mesh track (SMT) grid of wire joined in 3-inch squares. Pierced Steel Planking was also used for parking areas, as well as for dispersal sites, when it was available. In addition, tents were used for billeting and also for support facilities; an access road was built to the existing road infrastructure; a dump for supplies, ammunition, and gasoline drums, along with a drinkable water and minimal electrical grid for communications and station lighting.

Once completed it was turned over for use by the United States Army Air Force Twelfth Air Force 47th Bombardment Group from 9–20 August 1943, flying A-20 Havoc light bombers. From Torrente Comunelli, the group flew missions over Sicily in support of the ground forces engaged in battle

When the 86th moved out the airfield was closed and dismantled. Today there remains a slightly visible main runway in an agricultural field.
