= Ponte Galeria Airfield =

Abandoned military airfield in Italy

Ponte Galeria Airfield
- Part of Twelfth Air Force

Site information
- Type: Military airfield
- Controlled by: United States Army Air Forces

Location
- Coordinates: 41°49′47.96″N 012°20′09.34″E

Site history
- Built: 1943
- In use: 1943-1944

Location of Ponte Galeria Airfield, Lazio

Ponte Galeria Airfield is an abandoned World War II military airfield in Italy, located approximately 11 km northeast of Fiumicino, 15 km west-southwest of Rome.

It was an all-weather temporary field built by the United States Army Air Force XII Engineer Command using a graded earth compacted surface, with a prefabricated hessian (burlap) surfacing known as PHS. PHS was made of an asphalt-impregnated jute which was rolled out over the compacted surface over a square mesh track (SMT) grid of wire joined in 3-inch squares. Pierced Steel Planking was also used for parking areas, as well as for dispersal sites, when it was available. In addition, tents were used for billeting and also for support facilities; an access road was built to the existing road infrastructure; a dump for supplies, ammunition, and gasoline drums, along with a drinkable water and minimal electrical grid for communications and station lighting.

Once completed it was turned over for use by the Twelfth Air Force 47th Bombardment Group.

The 47th first arrived at the airfield on 10 June 1944, flying A-20 Havoc aircraft. The group stayed briefly, moving to Ombrone Airfield on 27 June

When the 47th pulled out, the airfield was dismantled and abandoned. Today, the airfield is now reclaimed by agriculture, with little or no evidence of its existence.
