= Vesuvius Airfield =

World War II military airfield in Italy

Vesuvius Airfield
- Part of Twelfth Air Force

Site information
- Type: Military airfield
- Controlled by: United States Army Air Forces

Location
- Coordinates: 40°50′27.98″N 014°30′59.43″E

Site history
- Built: 1943
- In use: 1943-1944

Location of Vesuvius Airfield, Sicily

Vesuvius Airfield is an abandoned World War II military airfield in Italy, located approximately two km (1.2 mi) east-northeast of San Giuseppe Vesuvianom about 21 km (13 mi) east of Naples.

It was an all-weather temporary field built by the XII Engineer Command using a graded earth compacted surface, with a prefabricated hessian (burlap) surfacing known as PHS. PHS was made of an asphalt-impregnated jute which was rolled out over the compacted surface over a square mesh track (SMT) grid of wire joined in 3-inch squares. Pierced Steel Planking was also used for parking areas, as well as for dispersal sites, when it was available. In addition, tents were used for billeting and also for support facilities; an access road was built to the existing road infrastructure; a dump for supplies, ammunition, and gasoline drums, along with a drinkable water and minimal electrical grid for communications and station lighting.

Once completed it was turned over for use by tactical light bombers of the United States Army Air Force Twelfth Air Force 47th Bombardment Group.

The 47th first arrived at the airfield on 10 January 1944, however it had to abandon the field on 22 March 1944 due to the eruption of Mount Vesuvius which severely damaged the field and several A-20 Havoc aircraft. The group was evacuated to Capodichino Airport near Naples for several weeks until they returned to the repaired base on 25 April, remaining until 10 June 1944.

When the 47th pulled out, the airfield was dismantled and abandoned. Today, the location of the field can not be precisely determined, as the suburbs of Naples have expanded and the area where it was located is now developed.
