= Souk-el-Arba Airfield =

Abandoned military airfields in Tunisia

Souk-el-Arba airfield complex
- Part of Royal Air Force and Twelfth Air Force

Site information
- Type: Military airfield complex
- Condition: Returned to civilian uses

Location
- Coordinates: 36°29′N 08°48′E

Site history
- Built: Various dates up to 1943
- In use: (By Allied forces) November 1942 to about August 1943

Location of Souk-el-Arba Airfields, Tunisia

The Souk-el-Arba Airfields are a pair of World War II military airfields in Tunisia, located near what was at the time the village of Souk-el-Arba but since 1966 has been known as Jendouba. The location is approximately 130 km west-southwest of Tunis.

== Souk-el-Arba I ==
The original airfield, which pre-dates Operation Torch, was located immediately to the south-east of the town and was captured by paratroops of the British 1st Parachute Brigade on 16 November 1942.

Within days, Souk-el-Arba I was used by the Royal Air Force, an example being No. 255 Squadron.

== Souk-el-Arba II ==
The second airfield was constructed later by US military engineers, located about 4 km to the south-west of the town and used primarily by American bombers.

Souk-el-Arba II was a temporary airfield constructed by Army Engineers, using compacted earth for its runway, parking and dispersal areas, not designed for heavy aircraft or for long-term use.

Also known as Engle Field, it was used by the United States Army Air Force Twelfth Air Force during the North African campaign. The units known to be assigned to the airfield were:

- HQ, 47th Bombardment Wing, 8 June-7 August 1943
- 47th Bombardment Group, 13 April-1 July 1943, A-20 Havoc
- 321st Bombardment Group, 1 June-8 August 1943, B-25 Mitchell
- 82d Fighter Group, 13 June-3 August 1943, P-38 Lightning

After the Americans moved east to Sicily in August, the airfield was closed and dismantled. Today, the former main runway is visible in aerial photography and, other than two hangars south of the runway, no buildings or physical features remain.

== Bibliography ==
- Maurer, Maurer. Air Force Combat Units of World War II. Maxwell AFB, Alabama: Office of Air Force History, 1983. ISBN 0-89201-092-4.
- Maurer, Maurer, ed. (1982) [1969]. Combat Squadrons of the Air Force, World War II (PDF) (reprint ed.). Washington, DC: Office of Air Force History. ISBN 0-405-12194-6. LCCN 70605402. OCLC 72556. Archived from the original (PDF) on December 20, 2016.
- Johnson, Kenneth M. Capt. USAAF. "My stretch in the Service, book III". Personal collection of Jeffrey M. Johnson, 1943
