= Ombrone Airfield =

Abandoned World War II military airfield in Italy

Ombrone Airfield
- Part of Twelfth Air Force

Site information
- Type: Military airfield
- Controlled by: United States Army Air Forces

Location
- Coordinates: 42°46′57.38″N 011°11′18.57″E

Site history
- Built: June 1944
- In use: 1944

Location of Ombrone Airfield, Tuscany

Ombrone Airfield is an abandoned World War II military airfield in Italy, located approximately 5 km south-west of Grosseto, and about 150 km northwest of Rome. It was a temporary airfield built by the US Army Corps of Engineers. The airfield was used by tactical aircraft of the United States Army Air Force Twelfth Air Force. Known units assigned were:

- 47th Bombardment Group, 27 June-11 July 1944, A-20 Havoc
- 57th Fighter Group, P-47 Thunderbolt

When the Americans pulled out, the airfield was dismantled and abandoned. Today, the airfield is now reclaimed by agriculture, with little or no evidence of its existence.
