= Follonica Airfield =

World War II airfield in Follonica, Italy

Follonica Airfield
- Part of Twelfth Air Force

Site information
- Type: Military airfield
- Controlled by: United States Army Air Forces

Location
- Coordinates: 42°55′08.76″N 10°45′42.76″E (Approximate)

Site history
- Built: 1944
- In use: 1944

Location of Follonica Airfield, Sicily

Follonica Airfield is an abandoned World War II military airfield in Italy, located in the vicinity of Follonica in Tuscany; about 180 km northwest of Rome.

It was an all-weather temporary field built by the United States Army Air Force XII Engineer Command using a graded earth compacted surface, with a prefabricated hessian (burlap) surfacing known as PHS. PHS was made of an asphalt-impregnated jute which was rolled out over the compacted surface over a square mesh track (SMT) grid of wire joined in 3-inch squares. Pierced Steel Planking was also used for parking areas, as well as for dispersal sites, when it was available. In addition, tents were used for billeting and also for support facilities; an access road was built to the existing road infrastructure; a dump for supplies, ammunition, and gasoline drums, along with a drinkable water and minimal electrical grid for communications and station lighting.

Once completed it was turned over for use by the Twelfth Air Force. Known units assigned were:

- 47th Bombardment Group, 18 September–October 1944, A-20 Havoc

When the Americans pulled out, the airfield was dismantled and abandoned. The land has since been turned into a housing development.
