= Chennault International Airport =

Public use airport in Louisiana, US

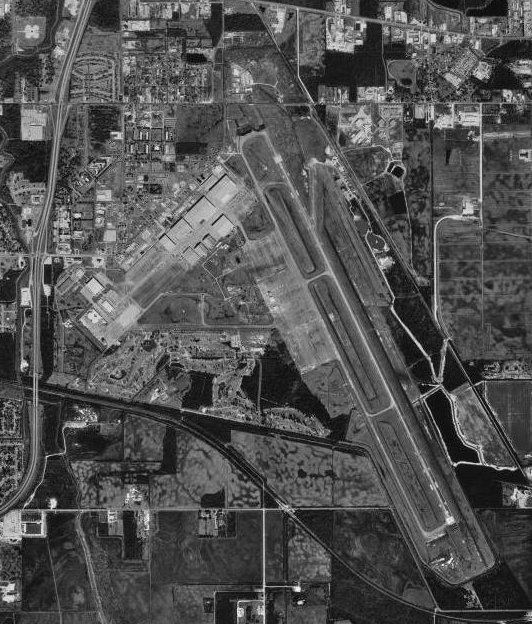
- USGS aerial photo as of 23 January 1994
- IATA: CWF; ICAO: KCWF; FAA LID: CWF

Summary
- Airport type: Public
- Owner: Chennault International Airport Authority
- Serves: Lake Charles, Louisiana
- Elevation AMSL: 16 ft (4.9 m)
- Coordinates: 30°12′38″N 093°08′35″W
- Interactive map of Chennault International Airport

Runways
Direction	Length		Surface
Direction	ft	m	Surface
15/33	10,702	3,262	Concrete

Statistics (2023)
- Aircraft operations (year ending 2/1/2023): 20,814
- Based aircraft: 24
- Sources: airport website and FAA

Chennault International Airport (IATA: CWF, ICAO: KCWF, FAA LID: CWF) is a public aerospace/industrial complex in Lake Charles, in Calcasieu Parish, Louisiana, United States. It is governed by the Chennault International Airport Authority. The facility covers 1,310 acres (530 ha) of land. The main runway is, at 10,702 feet (3,262 meters), among the longest along the Gulf Coast.

The facility was originally the Lake Charles Army Airfield, being renamed Chennault Air Force Base for military aviator Claire Chennault, who commanded the Flying Tigers fighter group during World War II.

The airport was named Louisiana's Airport of the Year in 2021.

== History ==
=== Origins ===
In June 1941, the Calcasieu Parish Police Jury leased the Lake Charles Municipal Airport to the federal government to build the Lake Charles Army Flying School, an advanced flying school for single-engine fighter pilots. It had two axillary fields for emergency and overflow landings and takeoffs. The airfield was assigned to the Army Air Corps Training Command, Gulf Coast Training Center.

The 481st School Squadron was reassigned to Lake Charles AAF on 10 February 1942, being redesignated as the 481st Single Engine Flying Training Squadron (Advanced) on 28 October, used the North American AT-6 Texan. The 482d and 483d squadrons were assigned shortly afterwords; being part of the 60th and 61st Single Engine Flying Training Groups (Advanced).

Advanced single-engine flight training was performed at Lake Charles until 13 January 1943 when it was reassigned to the newly established Aloe Army Airfield, Texas. AAF Flying Training Command was replaced by Third Air Force, which established a tactical bomber group training school at the airfield, being redesignated as Lake Charles Army Airfield.

Known units assigned were:

- 386th Bombardment Group (Medium), February–May 1943 (B-26 Marauder)
- 416th Bombardment Group (Light), June–November 1943 (A-20 Havoc)

In May 1943, the 336th Bombardment Group (Medium) was activated as a B-26 Marauder Replacement Training Unit. The 418th Bomb Group (Light) was also established in August as an A-20 RTU, but it never was staffed or equipped. At the end of the war, Lake Charles AAF was designated as a permanent installation, and the 47th Bombardment Group (Light) was reassigned from the closing Seymour-Johnson Field, in North Carolina. The 47th flew the A-26 Invader light bomber.

Budget cuts in 1946 forced the inactivation of the 47th Bomb Group, and the airfield was inactivated on 31 December. The airfield was reassigned to Air Technical Service Command for disposition. It subsequently was turned over to the City of Lake Charles on 28 February 1947.

=== Strategic Air Command ===
==== 44th Bombardment Wing ====
When the Korean War began in 1950 a cadre was formed to reactivate the 44th Bombardment Wing at March Air Force Base, California. The Wing's activation at March followed by a reassignement to the recently reactivated Lake Charles AFB in July 1951, where the wing became operational and was assigned to Fifteenth Air Force, 12th Air Division.

Lake Charles AFB was reactivated in February, and a crash project was undertaken to bring the World War II facility up to SAC standards for B-29 Superfortress operations. The first B-29 arrived on 1 September, and until August 1952, the 44th Bomb Wing served as operational training unit for B-29 aircrews and maintenance personnel for Far East Air Forces. From 10 October 1951 to 15 May 1952, the 44th trained all elements of the 68th Strategic Reconnaissance Wing.

Operational squadrons of the 44th Bombardment Group were the 44th, 66th, 67th and 68th Bombardment squadrons. Re-equipped with operational B-29s, the wing became a first-line strategic bombardment wing in August 1952. In April 1953, the 44th Air Refueling Squadron added an air-refueling mission to the wing with the addition of a Boeing KC-97 Stratotanker.

In 1953, the wing traded in its propeller-driven bombers and received the B-47E Stratojet. Participating in SAC Operation Reflex deployments with the B-47, the 44th deployed at Sidi Slimane AB, French Morocco, 19 January-22 February. 1953 and 19 April.-17 June. 1954. A fourth B-47 squadron, the 506th was added on 1 December 1958.

On 15 June 1960, the 44th was taken off operational status and was discontinued. Its squadrons were inactivated. The wing was transferred without personnel or equipment to Ellsworth AFB, South Dakota on 24 November 1961, being redesignated the 44th Strategic Missile Wing.

==== 68th Bombardment Wing ====
The 68th Strategic Reconnaissance Wing, Medium was established on 4 October 1951 and activated on 10 October at Lake Charles AFB . It received its initial cadre of 16 personnel from the 44th Bombardment Wing and began training as a Reconnaissance Wing using borrowed B-29s configured as RB-29s, assigning them to the 24th Strategic Reconnaissance Squadron.

It received its own B-29s in May 1952, then began training as a bombardment wing. Operational squadrons of the 68th Bombardment Group were the 51st and 52d Bombardment Squadrons. On June 16, 1952, the wing was redesignated the 68th Bombardment Wing, Medium.

On 16 January 1953 the B-29 Superfortress was replaced with the new all-jet B-47 Stratojet. The wing also received KC-97 Stratotankers and added a refueling mission. The 656th Bomb Squadron became the third B-47 squadron, with the tankers assigned to the 68th Air Refueling Squadron.

It conducted strategic bombardment training from May 1954 to June 1963 and air refueling operations from May 1954 to September 1957. It was deployed at RAF Fairford in the United Kingdom from June 14 to August 7, 1954 and at RAF Brize Norton, England from September 27, 1957 to January 8, 1958. A fourth B-47 squadron, the 657th, was added on 1 December 1958.

Local military and civilian leaders wanted to rename the Lake Charles Air Force Base for Lt Gen Claire Chennault prior to his death on July 27, 1958, but the Air Force declined on the basis of not wanting to name a base after a living person. The Air Force granted the request after Chennault’s death. At the dedication ceremony on November 14, 1958, Anna Chennault unveiled a large oil painting of her late husband. He had been commander of the famed Flying Tigers American volunteer airmen fighting in China during the Second World War.

=== Closure ===
In the 1960s, the Air Force began modernizing its fleet with the B-52 Stratofortress replacing the B-47 Stratojet and the KC-135 Stratotanker replacing the KC-97 Stratotanker. In addition, Titan II and Minuteman I intercontinental ballistic missiles (ICBMs also permitted the replacement of some bomber wings with missile wings. The 68th Bombardment Wing moved to Seymour Johnson Air Force Base in North Carolina on 15 April 1963, where it replaced the 4241st Strategic Wing at Seymour Johnson AFB, and was equipped with the B-52 and KC-135.

The move effectively closed Chennault Air Force Base, which officially inactivated on 30 June 1963.

It is now operated as Chennault International Airport, a fully operational facility dedicated to business, general aviation, and aviation maintenance.

== Other features ==
The airfield is home to the Chennault International Airshow.

LandLocked Aviation, a company mostly known for painting and refinishing aircraft, has their base at CWF. They have partnered with major airlines such as Delta Air Lines and United Airlines, and they also paint military aircraft.

== Accidents ==
- On March 14, 1972, a USAF Douglas C-47 crashed while practicing touch-and-gos at CWF. The aircraft landed hard and veered to the left into a covered concourse. All four occupants died.
- On August 27, 2020, A 747SP belonging to Las Vegas Sands Corporation was damaged beyond repair by Hurricane Laura while stored at Chennault International Airport in Louisiana, U.S. The tip of the right wing struck a steel beam, causing the tip to separate. The nose section of the aircraft was also damaged by the wing of another aircraft stored at the airport.

== See also ==
- List of airports in Louisiana
