= Canrobert Airfield =

World War II military airfield in Algeria

Canrobert Airfield
- Part of Twelfth Air Force
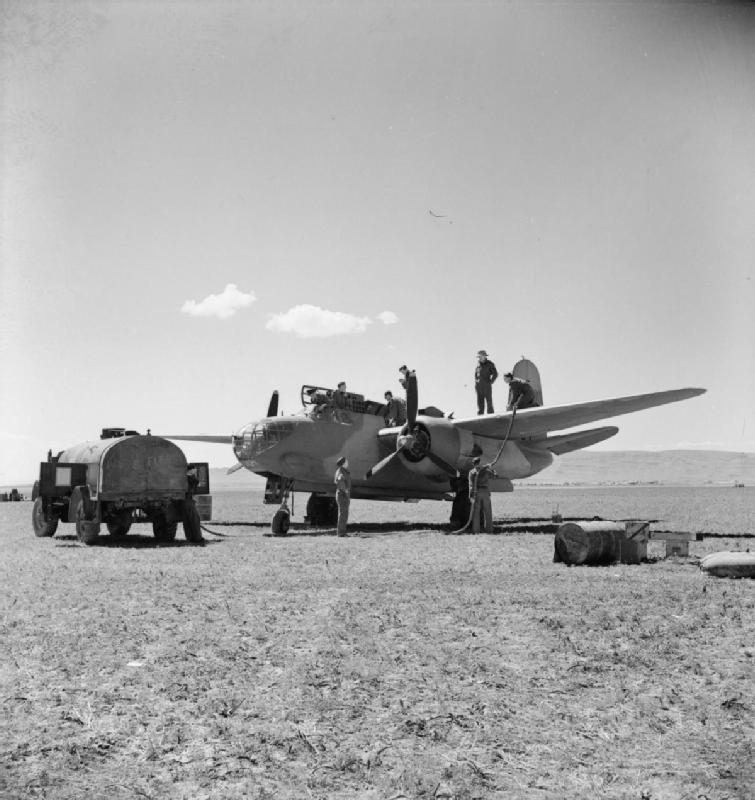
- Douglas Boston Mark III, AL740, of No. 114 Squadron RAF is refuelled for a further operation at Canrobert during World War II.

Site information
- Type: Military Airfield
- Controlled by: United States Army Air Forces

Location
- Coordinates: 35°50′34.05″N 007°07′12.39″E

Site history
- Built: 1943
- In use: 1943

Location of Canrobert Airfield, Algeria

Canrobert Airfield was a World War II military airfield in Algeria, located approximately 4 km south of Oum El Bouaghi, approximately 70 km southeast of Constantine. It was used by the United States Army Air Force Twelfth Air Force during the North African campaign against the German Afrika Korps. The Allied commanders made desperate efforts to prepare forward airfields for the use of fighters and fighter-bombers. Canrobert was one of these intermediate fields.

Known Twelfth Air Force units assigned were:

- 47th Bombardment Group, 6–30 March 1943, A-20 Havoc
- 81st Bombardment Squadron, (12th Bombardment Group), 16 March – 3 May 1943, B-25 Mitchell
- 82d Bombardment Squadron, (12th Bombardment Group), 16 March – 1 May 1943, B-25 Mitchell
- 308th Fighter Squadron, (31st Fighter Squadron), 21–25 February 1943, Spitfire

When the Americans moved out in May 1943, the airfield was dismantled and abandoned. Today agriculture has reclaimed the land where the airfield existed; however, a faint outline of its main runway can be seen in aerial photography.
