= List of United States Air Force reconnaissance aircraft =

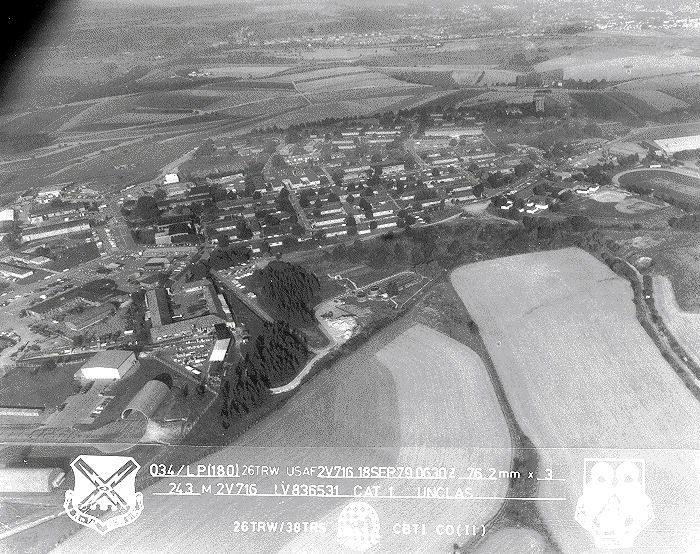
RF-4C Phantom II photo of Zweibrücken Air Base, West Germany, photographed on September 18, 1979

This is a list of aircraft used by the United States Air Force and its predecessor organizations for combat aerial reconnaissance and aerial mapping.

The first aircraft acquired by the Aeronautical Division, U.S. Signal Corps were not fighters or bombers but reconnaissance aircraft. From the first days of World War I, the airplane demonstrated its ability to be the "eyes of the army." Technology has improved greatly over the almost century since the first reconnaissance aircraft used during World War I. Today reconnaissance aircraft incorporate stealth technology; the newest models are piloted remotely. The mission of reconnaissance pilots remains the same, however.

The United States became a leader in development of aircraft specifically designed for the reconnaissance role; examples include the Lockheed SR-71, Lockheed U-2, Republic XF-12, and Hughes XF-11 (the latter two did not enter production). Most other nations that have developed reconnaissance aircraft generally used modified versions of standard bomber, fighter, and other types. The United States has, of course also operated reconnaissance variants of aircraft initially designed for other purposes, as the list below demonstrates.

== World War I aircraft ==
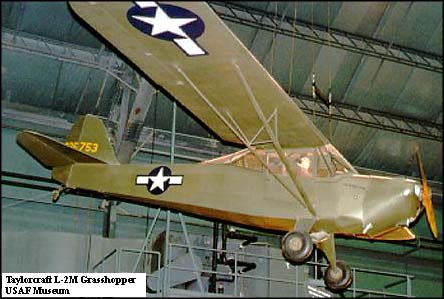
O-57 Grasshopper at the National Museum of the United States Air Force

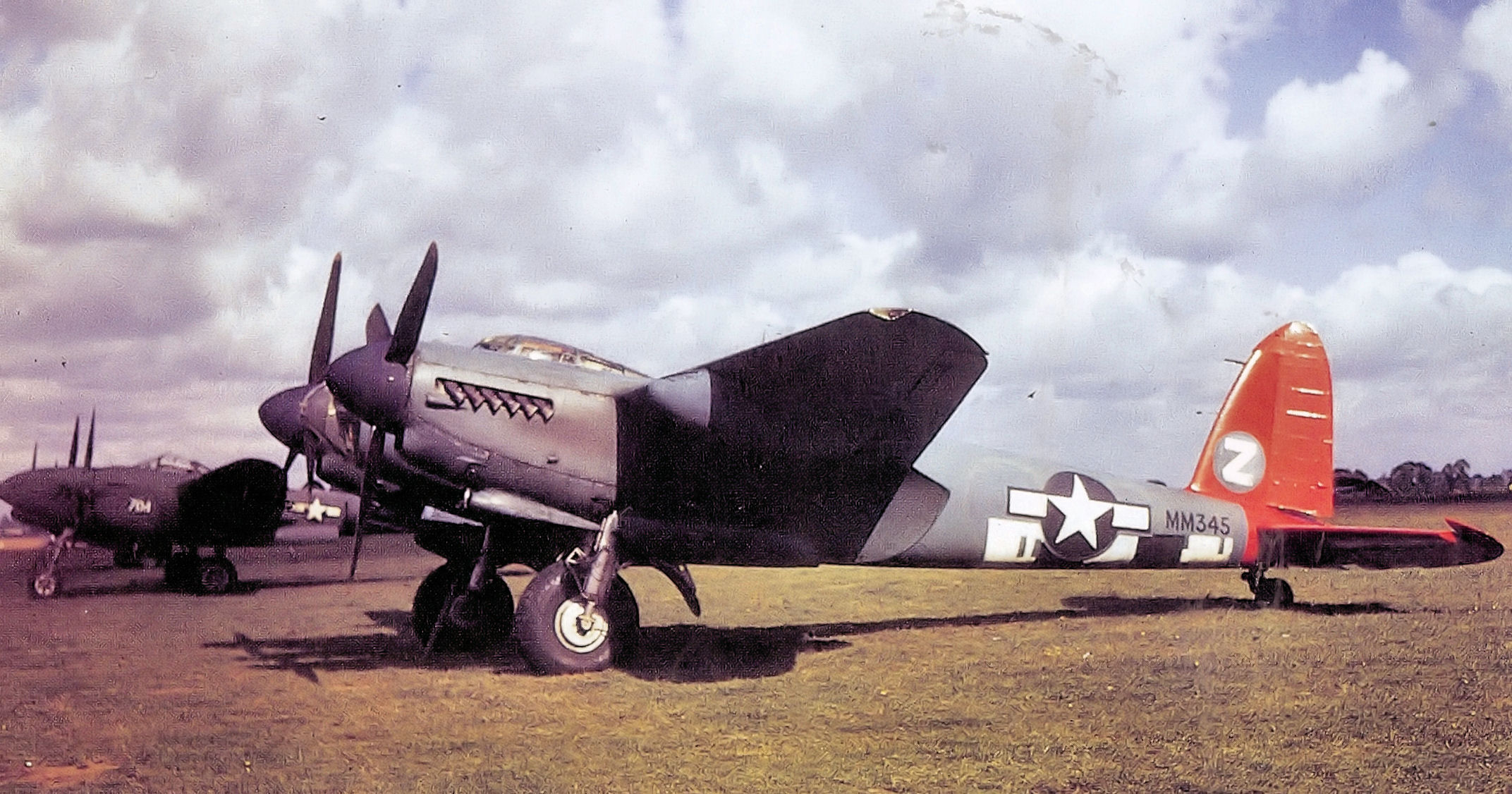
A de Havilland Mosquito PR Mk XVI (F-8) of the 654th BS, Eighth Air Force at RAF Watton, 1944

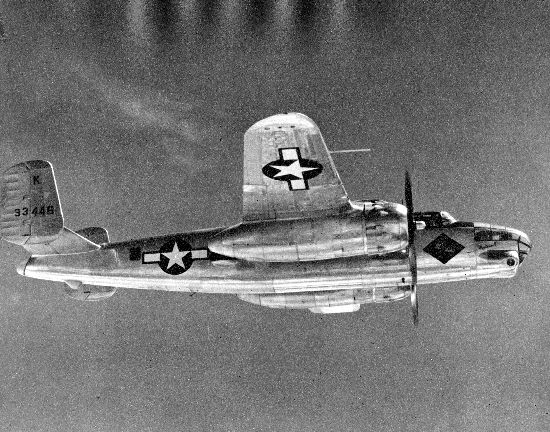
North American B-25D (F-10) Mitchell photographic reconnaissance and mapping aircraft

North American P-51C-5-NT Mustang (F-6C) Serial No 42-103368 of the 15th TRS at St. Dizler Airfield, France, Autumn 1944. This aircraft was flown by Captain John H. Hoefker, who used it to shoot down three enemy aircraft in June 1944.

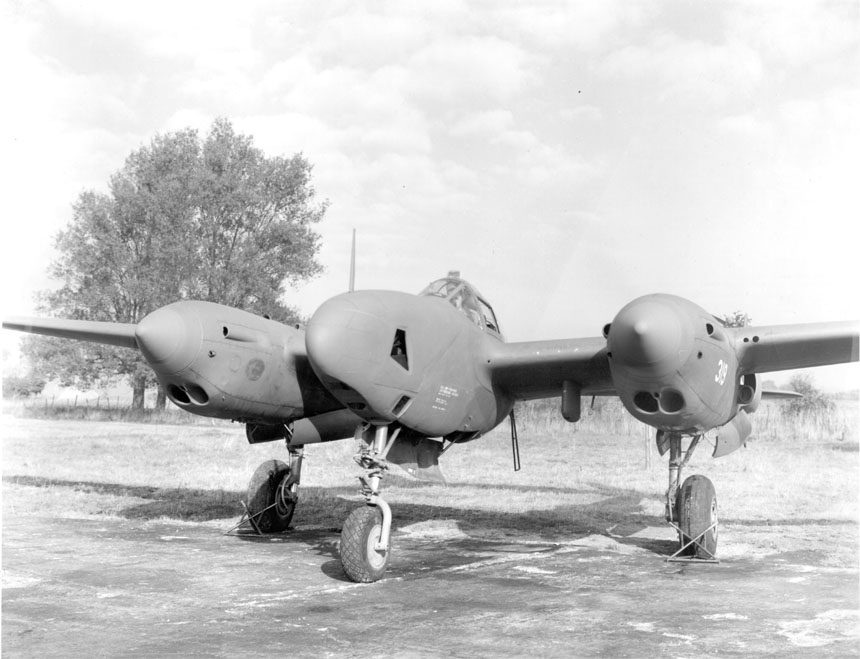
P-38G (F-5A) photographic reconnaissance aircraft

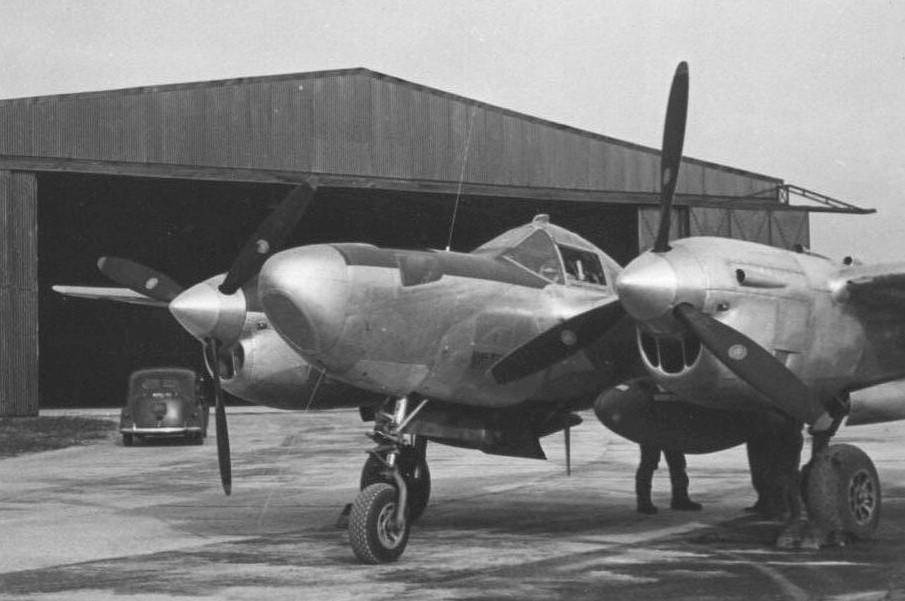
Lockheed P-38J reconnaissance aircraft of the 7th Reconnaissance Group (7th PG), RAF Mount Farm (detached to RAF Foulsham alongside No. 192 Squadron RAF radar countermeasure unit), England Sept 1944–Feb 1945

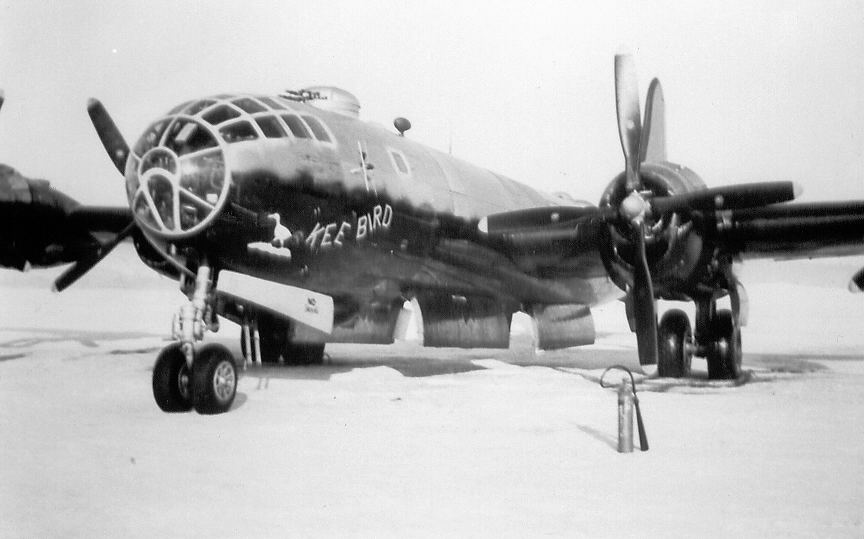
Boeing B-29-95-BW (F-13) Superfortress "Kee Bird", 45-21768 46th Reconnaissance Squadron, 1947

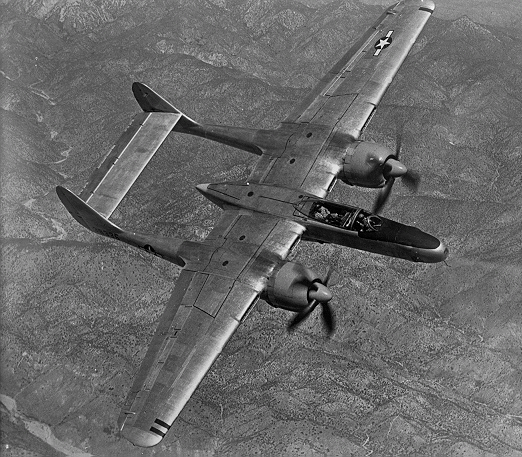
Northrop F-15A Reporter photographic reconnaissance aircraft

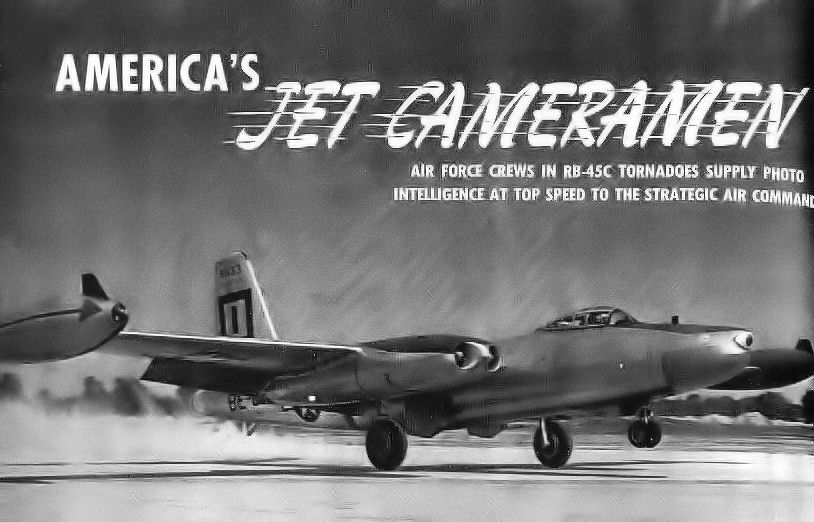
North American RB-45C-5-NA Tornado 48-033, 91st Strategic Reconnaissance Wing

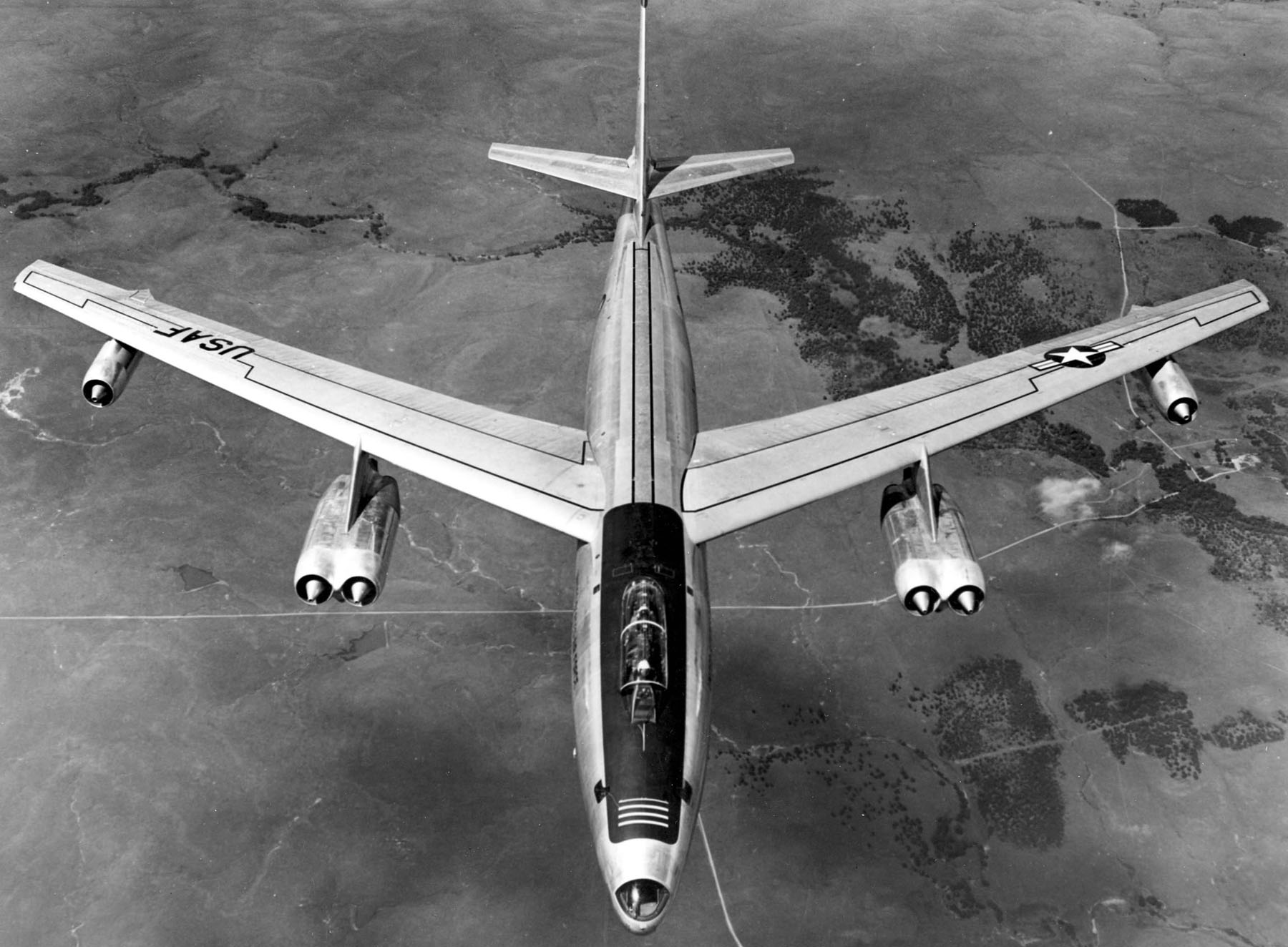
Boeing RB-47E Stratojet reconnaissance bomber

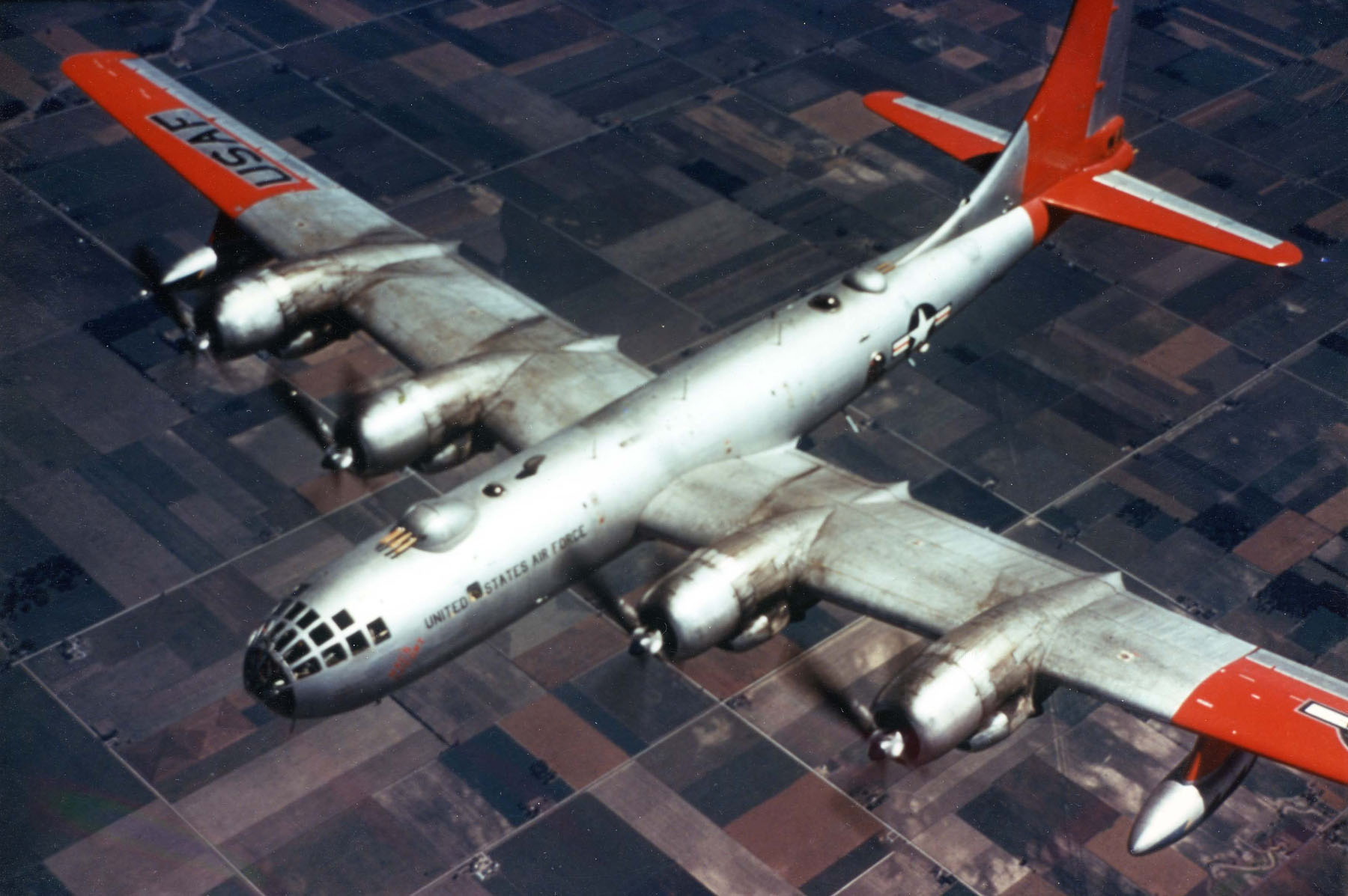
Boeing RB-50F Serial No 47-144, 55th Strategic Reconnaissance Wing

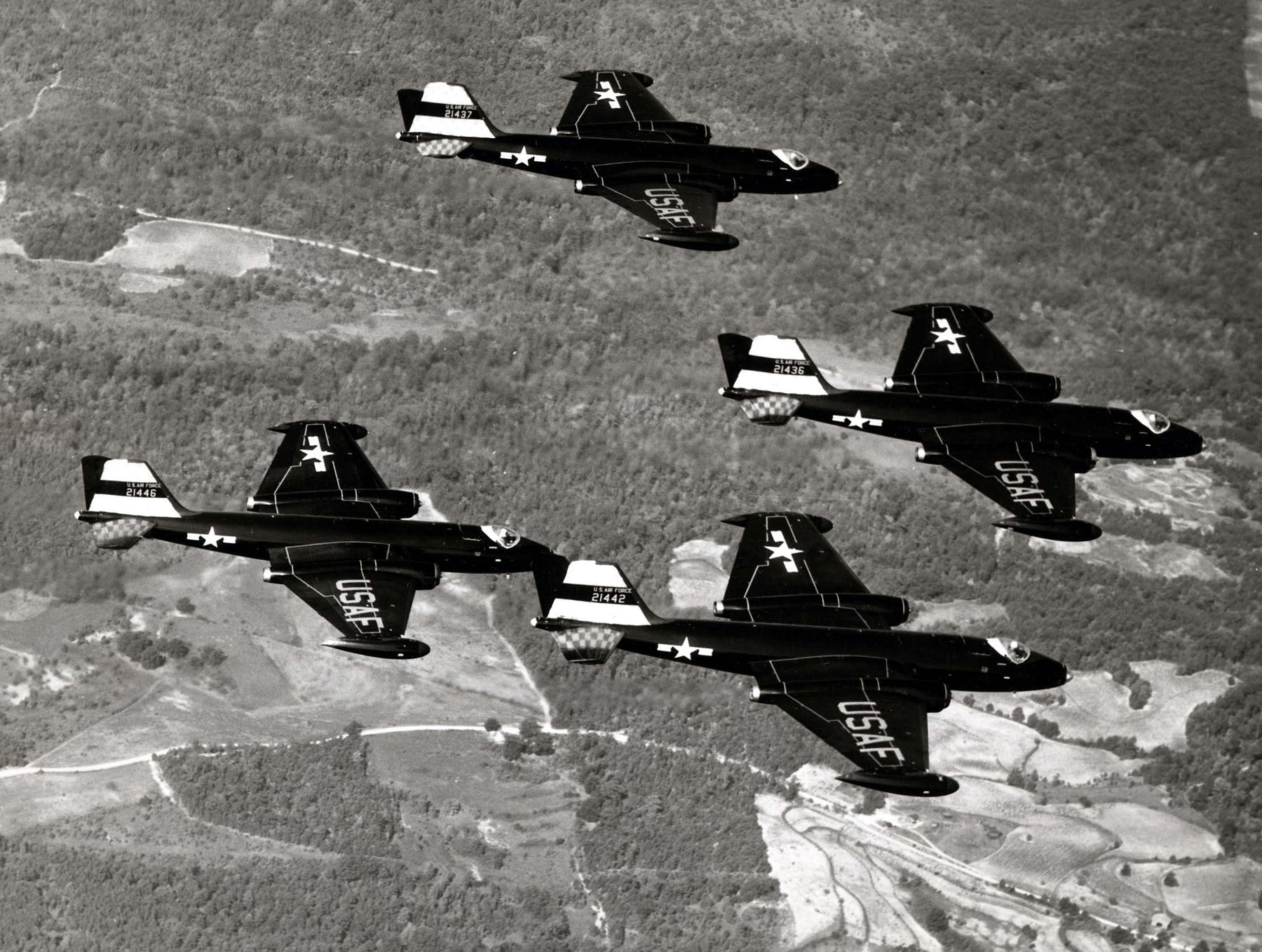
RB-57As of the 363d Tactical Reconnaissance Wing, 1954

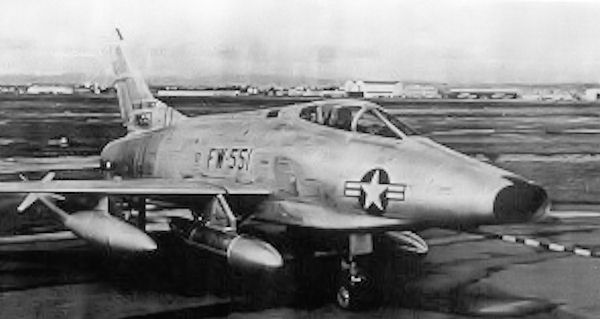
North American RF-100A-10-NA Super Sabre 53-1551. Used by Detachment 1 of 7407th Support Sqn of 7499th Support Group. Crashed near Neidenbach, West Germany Oct 1, 1956. Pilot ejected safely.

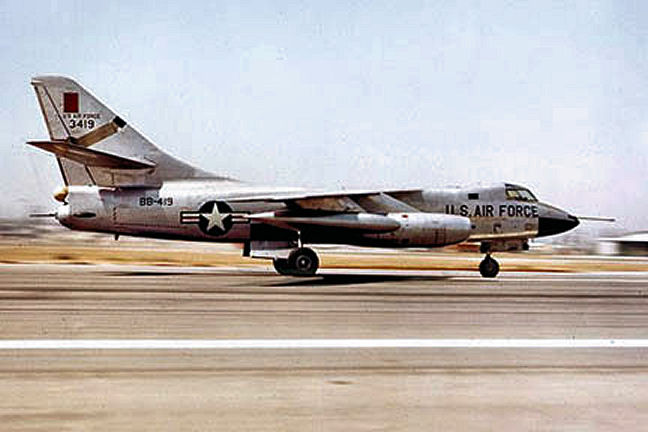
Douglas RB-66B-DL Destroyer Serial No 54-0419, 25th Tactical Reconnaissance Wing, 1965

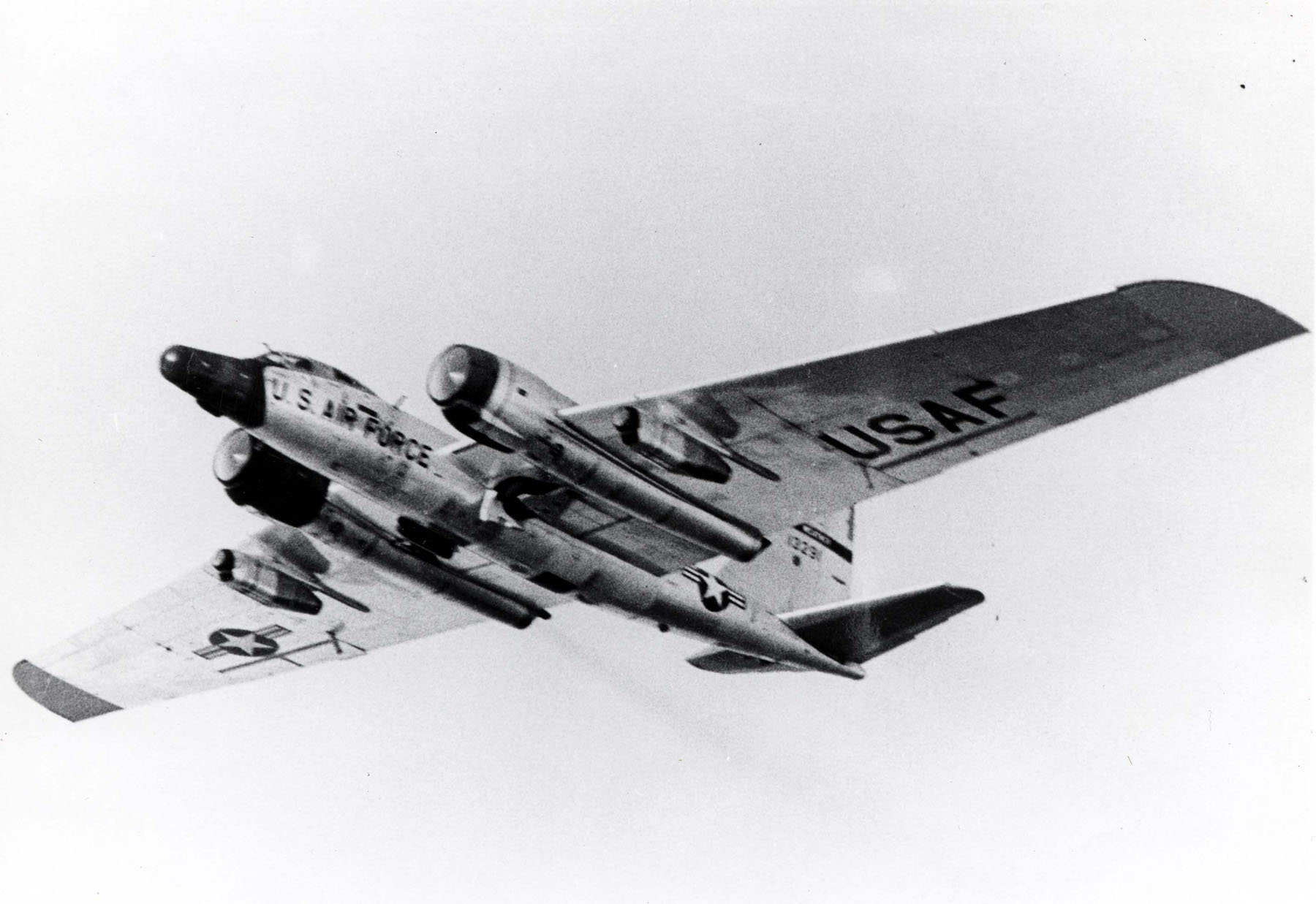
Martin/General Dynamics RB-57F-CF 63-13291, 7407th Combat Support Squadron, Rhein-Main AB, West Germany. Aircraft retired to AMARC as BM0106 on May 30, 1974.

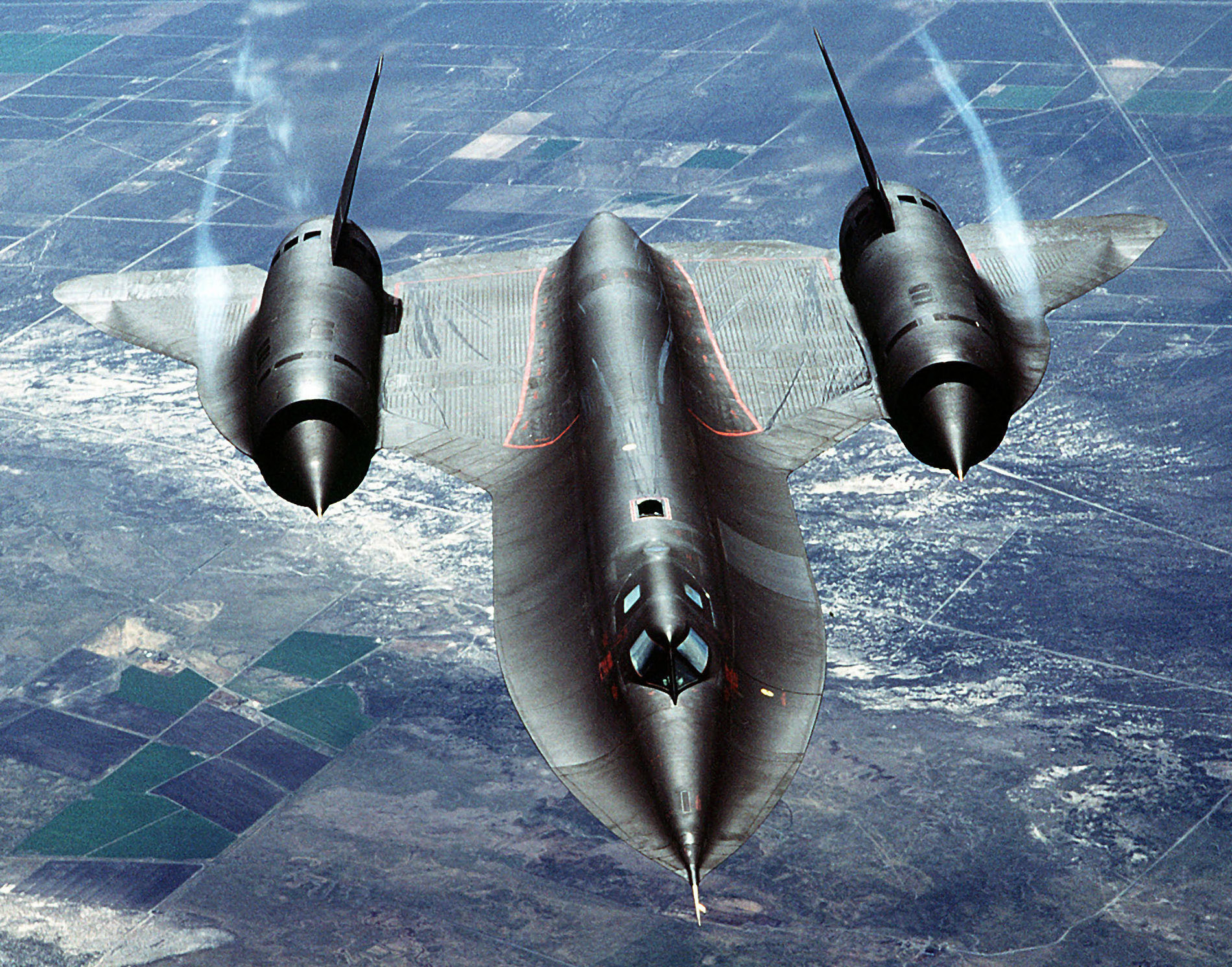
SR-71 Blackbird

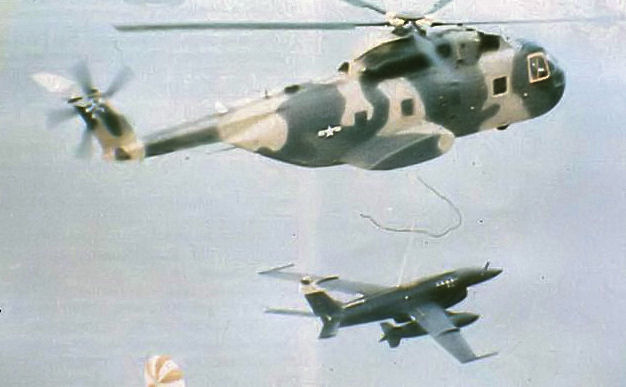
556th Reconnaissance Squadron AQM-34R (Ryan Model 147TF) Combat Dawn RPV retrieved in mid-air by Sikorsky CH-3E

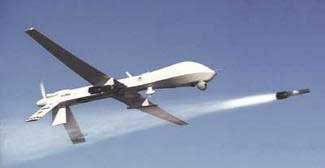
Predator launching a Hellfire missile

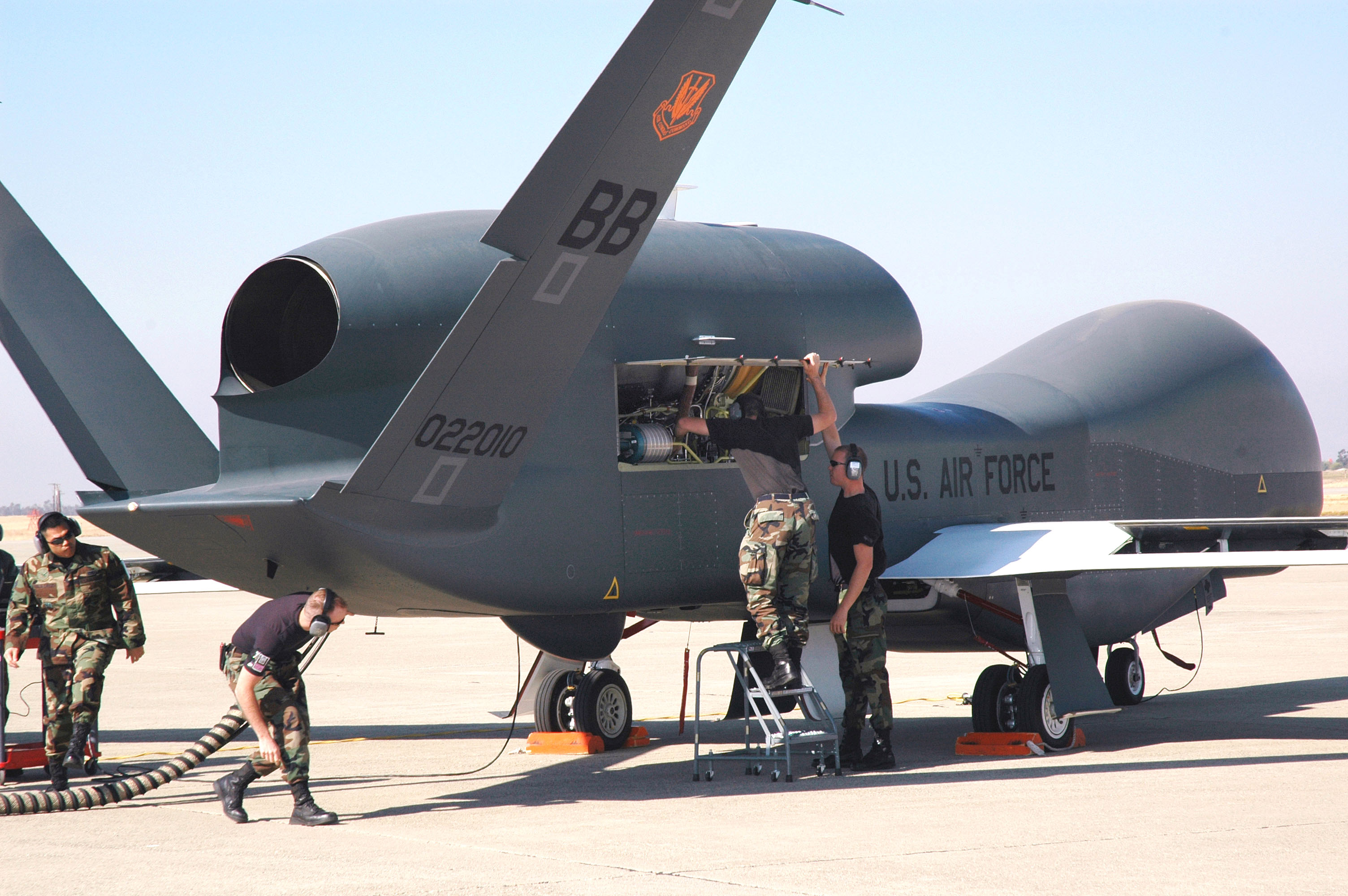
RQ-4 Global Hawk (02-2010) at Beale AFB

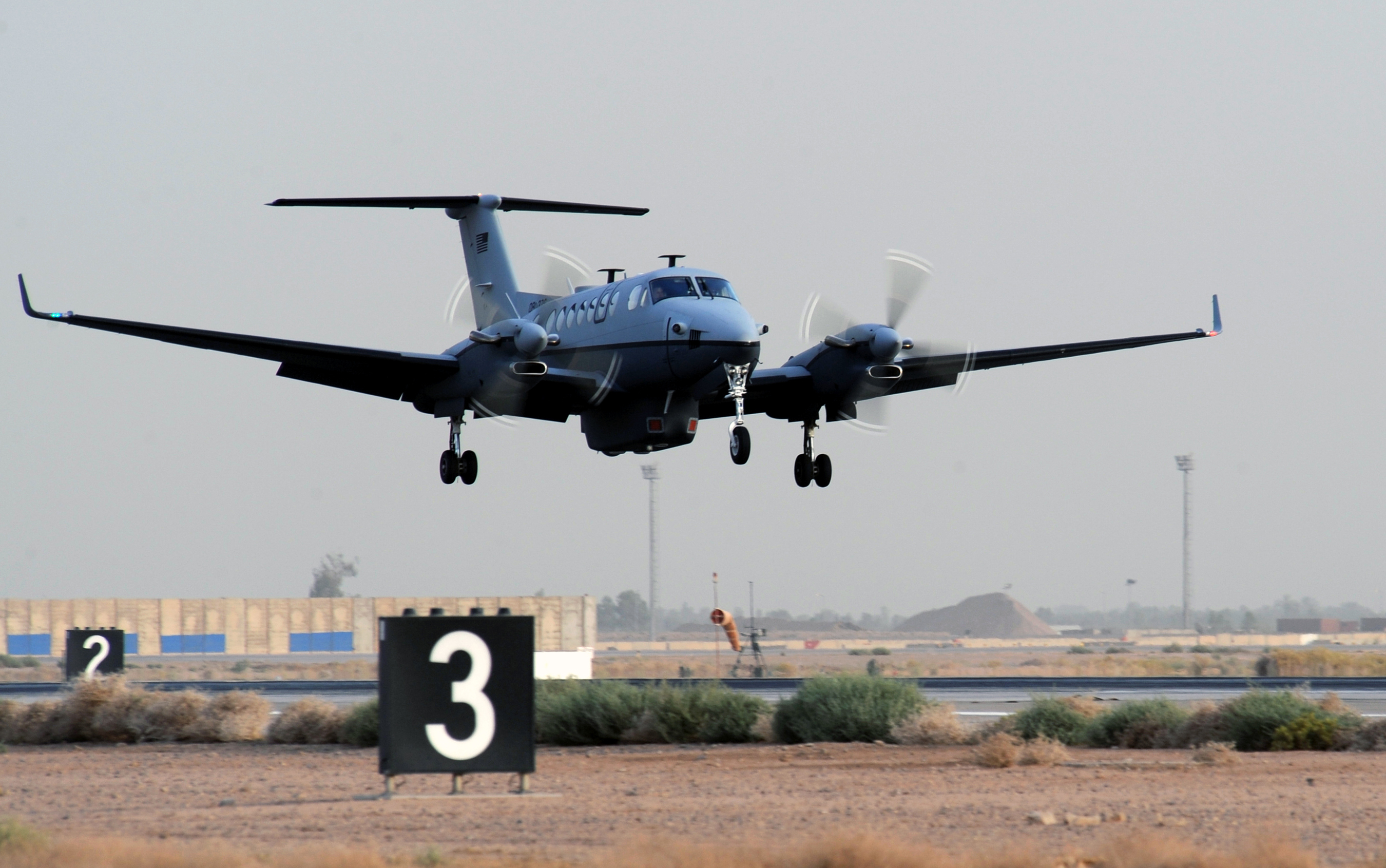
MC-12W Liberty (08-0376) of the 362nd Expeditionary Reconnaissance Squadron, Joint Base Balad, Iraq

Initially flown with a pilot and an observer, the observer would often sketch the scene of the ground below. Soon, some English observers thought it would be easier and more accurate to use their cameras to photograph the enemy lines. Unfortunately, both sides knew that if they were receiving valuable information from their pilots, the other side must be doing the same, and aircraft became armed to shoot down the other's. After the war, England estimated that its flyers took one-half million photographs during the four years of the war, and Germany calculated that if you laid all its aerial photographs side by side, they would cover an area six times the size of Germany.

The United States did not produce any aircraft of its own design for use in combat during World War I; however, several British and French designs were used by Air Service Aero Squadrons for reconnaissance missions.

- Airco DH.4

British two-seat biplane day-bomber, used by the Air Service; DH-4-BP Experimental photographic reconnaissance version. Produced under licence in the United States and used by the Army Air Service until 1932.

- AR-2 (Avion de Reconnaissance)
- Breguet 14
- Salmson 2A2

French biplane reconnaissance aircraft.

- Royal Aircraft Factory F.E.2
- SPAD S.XIII

== World War II and later aircraft ==
Douglas A-20 Havoc|A-20 Havoc

Lockheed F-15|Lockheed P-38

== Attack aircraft ==
- A-20 Havoc

The F-3A was a conversion of 46 A-20J and K models for night-time photographic reconnaissance (F-3 were a few conversions of the original A-20). It was used in all major Theaters of Operations. The first Allied aircraft to land at Itazuke Airfield, Japan after the August 1945 surrender was an F-3A.

- A-29 Hudson

A-29B converted for photographic survey work.

== Bomber aircraft ==
- B-17 Flying Fortress

The F-9 was the photographic reconnaissance variant.
F-9A was assigned to some B-17Fs that were converted to photographic configuration in a manner similar to that of the F-9 but differing in some camera details. Both the F-9s and F-9As were re-designated F-9B after further camera changes.
F-9C was assigned to ten B-17Gs converted for photographic reconnaissance in a manner similar to the F-9, F-9A, and F-9B conversions of the B-17F. Redesignated FB-17 after 1948.

- B-18 Bolo

Obsolete as a bomber, B-18Bs and B-18Cs were used for anti-submarine warfare reconnaissance after the Attack on Pearl Harbor until their withdrawal from service in 1943. Replaced by the B-24 Liberator which had a substantially longer range and a much heavier payload.

- B-24 Liberator

The F-7 was the photographic reconnaissance variant.
XF-7 was the designation of B-24D 41-11653 by removing all the bombing equipment and installing eleven reconnaissance cameras in the nose, bomb bay, and aft fuselage.
F-7 was the designation of four additional B-24Ds were converted to reconnaissance configuration.
F-7A were B-24Js that had a camera located in the nose, and cameras installed in the aft bomb bay. Full defensive armament suite of the bomber was retained.
F-7B were B-24Ms which carried all five cameras in the aft bomb bay. Most F-7Bs were conversions of late-model B-24Ms, although a few B-24Js and Ls became F-7Bs as well.

- B-25 Mitchell

The F-10 was the photographic reconnaissance variant of 45 B-25Ds. Used primarily for mapping over remote areas which had been poorly mapped. Mostly flown over areas of the Pacific, Northern Canada, Amazon basin of Brazil and over the Himalayas.

- A-26 Invader

RB-26B, RB-26C based on variants developed in the postwar era. Used for night photography and carried flash flares for illumination.
RB-26L was assigned to two RB-26Cs that were modified in 1962 for night photography missions in South Vietnam. Assigned to Bien Hoa Air Base in March 1963, and were for a while the only aircraft in South Vietnam with any real night reconnaissance capability.

- B-29 Superfortress

The F-13 was the photographic reconnaissance version of the B-29 initially deployed to the Pacific theater in 1944–45. An F-13 conducted the first flight by an Allied aircraft over Tokyo since the Doolittle Raid of April 1942.
F-13A was the B-29A model. Carried three K-17B, two K-22 and one K-18 cameras with provisions for others. Redesignated as RB-29/RB-29A in 1948. Later reconnaissance versions were primarily postwar developments to perform SAC's global reconnaissance mission. Six B-29A/F-13As had Wright R-3350-CA-2 fuel injected engines installed and were eventually designated as RB-29Js. Other versions included weather reconnaissance WB-29s which could monitor radiation levels after nuclear weapons tests.

- B-36 Peacemaker

Reconnaissance versions of the B-36 were used by SAC throughout the 1950s.
RB-36D carried up to 23 cameras, primarily K-17C, K-22A, K-38, and K-40 cameras. Included a small darkroom where a photo technician could develop the film. The second bomb bay contained up to 80 T86 photo flash bombs, while the third bay could carry an extra 3000 gallon droppable fuel tank. The fourth bomb bay carried ferret ECM equipment. Had a 50-hour flight endurance capability.
RB-36Es were B-36As refitted as reconnaissance aircraft. Also equipped with the four J-47 jet engines and advanced electronics.

- B-45 Tornado

RB-45C was the reconnaissance version of the B-45, the first United States jet bomber. A total of 12 cameras. Flew combat missions over Korea, but found to be vulnerable to the MiG-15 and withdrawn. Also flew penetration missions over Eastern Europe but withdrawn in the mid-1950s.

- B-47 Stratojet

Reconnaissance versions of the B-47 were SAC's first very long range jet strategic reconnaissance aircraft.
RB-47B Daylight only reconnaissance version.
YRB-47B was a conversion of the B-47B specifically intended for the training of RB-47E crews.
RB-47E Strategic reconnaissance version. As compared with the standard B-47E, the nose of the RB-47E was 34 inches longer so that it could house a special air-conditioned compartment for cameras and other sensitive equipment. Eleven cameras could be carried, along with ten photoflash bombs and supplementary photoflash cartridges for night photography.
WB-47E Weather reconnaissance version which could perform atmospheric sampling and monitoring. Served in the 1960s as replacement for WB-50Ds.
RB-47H / ERB-47H Built for the electronic intelligence (ELINT) mission, extensively refitted with monitoring equipment and additional (3 on RB-47H, only 2 on ERB-47H) Electronic Warfare Officers called "Crows" accommodated in a pressurized bomb bay compartment. ERB-47H had a small but distinctive antenna fairing under the rounded nose, otherwise external appearance difficult to distinguish from RB-47H.

- Boeing B-50

The Boeing B-50 Superfortress was a postwar improvement of the B-29 with R-4360 Wasp Major engines (also used in the B-36). It became a versatile strategic reconnaissance platform developed and employed in multiple versions for SAC's global mission.
RB-50B 28 converted from B-50B for photographic reconnaissance and photographic mapping, all later to be reclassified/designated as RB-50E and RB-50F, respectively (see below). Camera suites of the reconnaissance and mapping aircraft were interchangeable; rear fuselage capsule carried nine cameras in four stations, weather instruments, and extra crew. Could be fitted with two 700-US-gallon (2,650 L) drop tanks under outer wings.
RB-50D Three B-50Ds modified by Goodyear Aircraft, Akron, Ohio for collection of specialized imagery in support of ATRAN (Automatic Terrain Recognition and Navigation) system for the TM-61B Matador missile (ATRAN would eventually be deployed in MGM-13 Mace).
RB-50E Redesignation of 14 photographic reconnaissance RB-50Bs in April 1951. Some equipped with palletized (for easy removal) SHORAN to eliminate interference with defensive armament system; others later assigned to photographic mapping projects. RB-50Es had limited SIGINT and weather data collection capabilities to suit mission requirements. Subsequent RB-50E ACRP (5 aircraft, all armament retained) and RB-50E-II (same 5 aircraft, all armament except tail guns removed) were remanufactures fitted to COMINT capabilities for monitoring frequency bands of Soviet bloc fighter aircraft and ground stations.
RB-50F Redesignation of 14 photographic mapping/survey RB-50Bs in April 1951. Fitted with SHORAN / HIRAN (HIgh precision SHORAN) designed to conduct mapping, charting, and geodetic surveys in conjunction with MATS and Air Photographic and Charting Service (APCS); weather reconnaissance gear retained and limited ELINT collection missions were able to be flown. Camera suite as RB-50E.
RB-50G 15 RB-50Bs converted at Boeing Wichita for signals intelligence (SIGINT) collection. Fitted with SHORAN navigation radar, forward pressure bulkhead relocated into shortened forward bomb bay to allow 5 electronic operator stations and 16-man crew. Subsequent RB-50G ACRP (5 aircraft, all armament retained) and RB-50G-II (4 aircraft, all armament except tail guns removed) were remanufactures of RB-50Gs from the same original batch and fitted to COMINT capabilities.
WB-50D 73 surplus B-50Ds converted as weather reconnaissance aircraft to replace worn out WB-29s. Fitted with extra gaseous oxygen storage tanks in the bomb bay, Doppler weather radar, atmospheric samplers (e.g. wing pylons to carry F-50 sampling pod) and other specialist equipment. Externally identified by additional radome in the forward lower gun turret position and air sampler scoop on upper aft fuselage. Some carried out highly classified atmospheric sampling missions from 1953–1955 for detection of Soviet atomic weapons testing and radiation level monitoring; also served as hurricane hunters. JWB-50D was a redesignation of aircraft Ser No 48-104 in its assignment to the Wright Air Development Center for equipment testing.

- B-52 Stratofortress

RB-52B was the designation of the B-52B when carrying a two-man pressurized capsule installed in the bomb bay which could perform electronic countermeasures or photographic reconnaissance work. The reconfiguring of the aircraft was a fairly straightforward process and the capsule could usually be installed in about four hours.

- B-57 Canberra

RB-57A Tactical Air Command/USAFE reconnaissance version of the B-57A bomber (1953-58). Tactical failure, replaced by RF-101C Voodoos.

RB-57A-1 In 1955, a program was begun to convert ten RB-57As to a high-altitude "RB-57A-1" reconnaissance under a project first known as Lightweight and later renamed Heartthrob. The black-painted aircraft being used for reconnaissance missions against the East Bloc in the late 1950s. One was rumored to have been shot down in 1956 while observing the Hungarian uprising. Two were operated by the Republic of China (Taiwan) Air Force, and one of these was known to have been shot down, on 18 February 1958, by Chinese fighters. Details still undisclosed.
RB-57A-2 Two RB-57As were modified with a bulbous nose containing AN/APS-60 mapping radar in 1957 under project SARTAC. Assigned to Germany, operational use still not disclosed.

RB-57D Initial high-altitude reconnaissance version of the B-57 Canberra. Capable of operation at altitudes of 65,000 feet with range of 2,000 nautical miles. Total of 20 aircraft eventually built.
RB-57E Patricia Lynn Project was a highly classified project during the Vietnam War where a small number of B-57Es were converted into high-altitude tactical reconnaissance aircraft used over Indochina.
RB-57F Substantially improved high-altitude reconnaissance version developed by General Dynamics in 1962. The USAF approached General Dynamics to investigate updating the RB-57 to produce a virtually new high-altitude reconnaissance aircraft. Designated RB-57F, the design was almost an entirely new aircraft with a three-spar wing structure of 122 feet span, powerful new Pratt & Whitney TF33-P-11 main engines and two detachable underwing J60-P-9s for boost thrust at high altitude. The aircraft carried high-altitude cameras which were able to take oblique shots at 45 degrees up to 60 nm range from the aircraft with a 30 inch resolution. ELINT/SIGINT equipment was carried in the nose. A total of 21 RB-57F aircraft were eventually re-manufactured from existing B-57A, B-57B and RB-57D airframes. Some RB-57Fs used in the Early Day program which involved high altitude air sampling for evidence of Soviet nuclear tests. All surviving examples redesignated WB-57F after 1968.

- B-66 Destroyer

RB-66 was the designation for the reconnaissance version of the USAF's B-66 tactical bomber, itself derived from the Navy A-3 Skywarrior.
RB-66B carried flash bombs in its bomb bay for night photography missions and was equipped with a battery of reconnaissance cameras. Was primary night photographic reconnaissance weapon system of TAC, PACAF and USAFE.
RB-66C was a specialized electronic reconnaissance and electronic countermeasures aircraft designed for jamming of Soviet built radar. Used in Europe; saw extensive use during the Vietnam War.

== Fighter aircraft ==
- Supermarine Spitfire

Spitfire PR XI was the photographic reconnaissance variant of the Mk IX Fighter. Received by Eighth Air Force in late 1943. All Eighth Air Force Spitfires delivered were in the standard RAF "PRU Blue" with the aircraft serial number painted on the tail.

- de Havilland Mosquito

Mosquito F-8-DH (Nose cameras), 40 Aircraft received by Eighth Air Force.
Mosquito PR Mk XVI (Bomb bay cameras) 80 Aircraft received by Eighth and Ninth Air Force. These were used for a variety of photographic and night reconnaissance missions

- P-38 Lightning

Was the primary long-range USAAF photographic reconnaissance fighter aircraft prior to introduction of the P-51. Used extensively in all major theaters of operations. F-4 and early F-5 Lightning photo reconnaissance variants were factory converted by Lockheed at Burbank, California; all later F-5 conversions were made after delivery by Lockheed's Dallas Modification Center near Dallas, Texas.

F-4-1 was based on the P-38E, ninety-nine built with initial delivery March 1942. Four nose-mounted K-17 cameras. Most were used for training in the United States; nine of these aircraft deployed to the United Kingdom as part of the 5th Photographic Squadron in mid-1942.
F-4A-1 based on P-38F-1-LO, twenty built.
F-5A based almost entirely on production blocks of the P-38G, 181 built. Began with a single F-5A-2 converted from P-38E in January 1942; then (from P-38Gs) twenty F-5A-1s, twenty F-5A-3s, and 140 F-5A-10s. All F-5A derivatives had provision for five cameras (one more than F-4).
F-5B based on P-38J-5-LO, 200 built with camera installation similar to F-5A-10. A Sperry automatic pilot was standard on the first ninety F-5Bs; remaining 110 F-5B-1s completed Lockheed's at-factory conversions of photo reconnaissance P-38s (all subsequent F-5 variants were modified at Dallas). Four former F-5Bs later supplied to the United States Navy as FO-1.
F-5C-1 based on P-38J-5-LO, approximately 123 built. Similar to F-5B-1 but with improved camera installation.
F-5D (XF-5D-LO) One F-5A-10-LO Ser No 42-12975 was modified as an experimental two-seat reconnaissance aircraft under the designation XF-5D-LO. The camera operator was located in a glazed nose compartment with two forward-firing 0.50-in machine guns. Three K-17 cameras were installed, one underneath the nose and one in each tail boom.
F-5E-2 based on P-38J-15-LO, 100 built. Similar to the F-5C-1.
F-5E-3 based on P-38J-25-LO, 105 built. Similar to the F-5C-1.
F-5E-4 based on P-38L-1-LO, 500 built; K-17 or K-18 cameras fitted as standard with a trimetrogon installation as an alternative.
F-5F Single aircraft conversion from former (P-38J) F5B-1 Ser No 42-68220.
F-5F-3 based on P-38L-5-LO, unknown number (see below) built all fitted with F-5F camera installation.
F-5G-6 based on P-38L-5-LO, with new elongated nose section enabling a wider selection of cameras to be fitted, including directly forward-facing in tip of nose.

Lockheed Burbank converted 440 total F-4/F-5s before Dallas continued conversion work to complete at least 828 aircraft, but grand total of P-38J/L-based photo reconnaissance Lightnings probably ran to over 1,000. Dallas conversions include F-5C-1 (approximately 123), F-5E-2 (100), F-5E-3 (105), and an unknown number of F-5E-4s, F-5F-3s and F-5G-6s. Several F-5G-6s that survived post-war disposal had their camera nose sections further modified by civilian aerial survey operators.

'Droop Snoot' Radar Countermeasures American Air Museum (at Imperial War Museum Duxford) has information and a photograph of a 'Droop Snoot' bombardier-formation leader variant P-38J-15-LO aircraft from 7th Reconnaissance Group (7th PG), RAF Mount Farm that was detached to RAF Foulsham alongside No. 192 Squadron RAF (Bomber Support), which operated as a radar countermeasure unit. The AAM/IWM site posting states this aircraft was "field modified April–May 1944 to 'Droop Snoot' configuration and fitted out with equipment and aerials for ELINT work. Detached to 192 Sqn RAF for Elint missions. Reported to have been converted to radar search aircraft and operated by 36th Bomb Squadron (a radar countermeasures unit) not sure if before or after RAF service." These 'Droop Snoot' modified two-seat Lightnings operated between September 1944 and February 1945 attached to No. 192 Squadron RAF, and in November 1944 "much time was spent in searching for radio signals from V-2s, though these were later found to be uncontrolled (V-2s had on-board guidance systems)."

The P-38J shown in the photograph has had its plexiglas nose painted-faired over with the nose upper windows and access panels in otherwise typical 'Droop Snoot' configuration. No details are provided on internal equipment fit for this aircraft.

- P-39 Airacobra

27 P-39Fs were converted into P-39F-2 variants for the ground-attack and reconnaissance role. Used for training, never engaged in combat.

- P-51 Mustang

F-6A, F-6B, F-6C, F-6D, F-6K all based on models of the P-51 Mustang. All F-6 aircraft retained their armament; missions were flown fully armed. Most F-6s were fitted with one K-24 oblique camera mounted behind the pilot in the cockpit and one vertical camera along centerline of the lower fuselage. F-6s eventually became the dominant long-range reconnaissance aircraft in ETO. In 1948, surviving F-6s were redesignated as RF-51D/K

- P-61 Black Widow

F-15A Reporter was a postwar photographic reconnaissance aircraft developed from the P-61 night fighter. Thirty-six produced; most sent to Japan. Extensive aerial photos were taken of beaches, villages, road networks, and cultural centers. Included in this job was the mapping of the Korean Peninsula, which proved invaluable when the Korean War broke out in 1950. A few also served in the Philippines and Celebes, where their mission included mapping of the route of the Bataan Death March for war crimes prosecutions. Last F-15A (officially redesignated RF-61C after 1947 although most unit personnel continued use of the original) retired just a few months before the outbreak of the Korean War.

- F-80 Shooting Star

RF-80A was first jet reconnaissance aircraft of the USAAF. The second YP-80A prototype, 44-84988, was completed in 1944 as the XF-14; a reconnaissance version of the basic fighter. It had a redesigned nose that rotated forward for servicing and carried only vertical seeing cameras. It was unarmed. The RF-80A was designated as such in 1948 and carried three or four cameras capable of side, downward and forward observation. The RF-80A proved itself in combat during the Korean War and took part in numerous sorties over North Korea as well as sorties along the border with North Korea and China, near the Yalu River. RF-80As deployed to USAFE in 1953; operated until 1955, last returned to United States in 1956. Remained in second-line service until 1958.
RF-80C. Photographic reconnaissance version of F-80C.

- F-84F Thunderstreak

RF-84F known as Thunderflash; replacement for RF-80 introduced in 1954. Most were replaced by McDonnell RF-101 Voodoo aircraft in the late 1950s. After that, they served with Air National Guard squadrons until well into the 1960s.

- F-86 Sabre

A reconnaissance version of the F-86 was a limited production/modification of the Sabre
RF-86A used in Korean War. Were modifications of F-86As at the Tsuiki REMCO facility in Japan
RF-86F was post Korean War variant used by Far East Air Forces for clandestine and standard reconnaissance missions after the Korean War ended. Limited production and service as USAF opted for the Republic RF-84F Thunderflash as its next-generation tactical reconnaissance aircraft.

- F-100 Super Sabre

RF-100A Highly classified reconnaissance version of the Super Sabre known as the "Slick Chick". 6 produced; a handful (3) were used by USAF primarily for penetration of Soviet-controlled airspace missions in Europe. Afterwards were sold to the Chinese Nationalist Air Force on Taiwan for penetration of mainland Communist China airspace. Carried four drop tanks rather than the usual two because the mission profile called for a lot of high-speed flight under afterburner and there was no provision for midair refuelling. Missions still undisclosed.

- F-101 Voodoo

The versatile Voodoo was the fastest USAF tactical reconnaissance aircraft put into service.
RF-101A USAF's first supersonic photographic reconnaissance aircraft. Flew vital reconnaissance missions over Cuba during the Missile Crisis of October 1962, confirming and then monitoring the Soviet missile buildup on that island. Used extensively in Europe, replacing RF-84Fs.
RF-101C Differed from RF-101A in being able to accommodate a centerline nuclear weapon, so that it could carry out a secondary nuclear strike mission if ever called upon to do so. Also flew over Cuba during Cuban Missile Crisis (unarmed).
RF-101H Remanufactured F-101Cs to serve as unarmed reconnaissance aircraft with the Air National Guard.
RF-101G Remanufactured F-101As to serve as unarmed reconnaissance aircraft with the Air National Guard.

- F-4 Phantom II

RF-4C (Model 98DF) Was primary USAF Tactical Reconnaissance aircraft from 1966-1992. The first operational unit to receive the RF-4C was the 16th TRS of the Tactical Air Command 363rd TRW at Shaw AFB, achieving initial combat-readiness in August 1965. Saw extensive use in USAFE; in PACAF during the Vietnam War flying day missions until 1972 over North and South Vietnam as well as Laos, usually flying alone and without fighter escort. The RF-4C posted an impressive record during the most intense years of the war.

Began Air National Guard service in 1971. Collapse of Soviet Union and Warsaw Pact in 1989 began retirement of active-duty RF-4Cs. Inactivation of the last USAFE and TAC RF-4C units was in the planning stages when Iraq invaded Kuwait in August 1990, and further inactivation plans were put on hold. RF-4Cs used during Operation Desert Shield/Desert Storm. When the first air strikes against Iraq took place on January 17, 1991 RF-4Cs were in action from the start. At first limited to daylight operations they flew over Kuwait almost every day in search of Republican Guard units; also flew over Baghdad looking for targets such as rocket fuel plants, chemical weapons plants, and command and communications centers. RF-4Cs were repeatedly diverted from other photographic missions to seek out Scud launchers hiding in western Iraq.

After Desert Storm RF-4Cs were retired rapidly. Nevada ANG finally turned in its last four RF-4Cs on September 27, 1995. This brought the era of RF-4C service with United States armed forces to an end after 30 years of operations.

Note: Both the F-15 Eagle and F-16 Falcon had prototype RF-15 and RF-16s built but were never put into production.

== Observation aircraft ==
Many developed in the 1920s and 1930s; a few saw combat during World War II. After the establishment of the USAF, light observation aircraft became an Army mission. O-2 Skymaster and OV-10 Broncos were Forward Air Control (FAC) aircraft of the Vietnam War, retired in the late 1970s, replaced by the OA-10A version of the A-10 Thunderbolt II.

Pre-1962 designations

- Loening OL (OA-1A/B/C, OA-2, OL-1/2/3/4/5/6/8/8A/9)
- Curtiss Falcon(O-1, O-11, O-39, A-3, F8C, OC, O2C)
- Douglas O-2
- Consolidated O-17 Courier
- Thomas-Morse O-19
- Douglas O-31
- Douglas O-38
- Curtiss O-40 Raven
- Douglas O-43
- Martin O-45
- Douglas O-46
- North American O-47
- O-49 Vigilant
- Curtiss O-52 Owl
- O-57 Grasshopper
- O-62 Sentinel

Post-1962 designations

- Cessna O-2 Skymaster
- OV-10 Bronco

== Strategic reconnaissance aircraft ==
- Martin/General Dynamics RB-57F Canberra

Developed from the Martin B-57 Canberra tactical bomber (which itself was a license-built version of the English Electric Canberra) for weather reconnaissance involving high-altitude atmospheric sampling and radiation detection in support of nuclear test monitoring, but four of the 21 modified aircraft performed solely as strategic reconnaissance platforms.

- Lockheed U-2 (TR-1A)

Developed by Central Intelligence Agency; first flight occurred at the Groom Lake (Area 51), Nevada on 1 August 1955. CIA and USAF U-2s began operations in 1956. Has been in continual use for over 50 years as primary USAF strategic reconnaissance aircraft.

- Lockheed SR-71 Blackbird

Initially developed as A-12 by Central Intelligence Agency; first flight took place at Groom Lake (Area 51), Nevada, on 25 April 1962. USAF developed SR-71 from CIA design; first flight took place on 22 December 1964. Operational use of SR-71 began in 1968. Retired in 1989 due to budget reductions. Three aircraft returned to service 1994; retired in 1998 due to budget reductions.

== Transport aircraft ==
- E-3 Sentry

Airborne warning and control system (AWACS) aircraft based on the Boeing 707 that provides all-weather surveillance, command, control and communications

- E-8 Joint STARS

Battle management and command and control aircraft based on the Boeing 707 that tracks ground vehicles and some aircraft, collects imagery, and relays tactical pictures to ground and air theater commanders.

- MC-12W Liberty

First flown in 2009. Aircraft is a medium-altitude manned special-mission turboprop tactical reconnaissance aircraft that supports coalition and joint ground forces. Provides real-time full-motion video and signals intelligence.

- C-45 Expeditor

F-2 Photographic reconnaissance trainer built to carry two to four aerial cameras, also performed mapping missions over the United States; F-2A improved version. 69 aircraft produced. Postwar redesignated as RC-45A in 1948; retired 1953

- EC-121 Warning Star

A military version of the Lockheed Constellation, the aircraft was designed to serve as an airborne early warning system to supplement the Distant Early Warning Line using two large radomes, a vertical dome above and a horizontal one below the fuselage.

- Boeing RC-135

RC-135s are a family of reconnaissance aircraft which perform a broad range of signals intelligence-related missions. Based on the C-135 Stratolifter airframe, multiple types of RC-135s have been in service since 1961. Many variants have been subsequently modified or upgraded numerous times (mostly via the USAF's long-running Big Safari program) resulting in a large variety of designations, configurations, and program names.

== Unmanned aerial vehicles ==
- Ryan Model 147

Series of Remotely Piloted Vehicles (RPVs) in multiple variants developed with funding from National Reconnaissance Office and deployment support of Strategic Air Command beginning in 1962. Initial project code name was Fire Fly, later known as Lightning Bug. Operated extensively from 1964 to 1975 across Southeast Asia during the Vietnam War and also conducted operations over China and North Korea.

- MQ-1B Predator

Hunter-killer UAV in use since 1995. Initially conceived in the early 1990s for reconnaissance and forward observation roles, the Predator carries cameras and other sensors but has been modified and upgraded to carry and fire two AGM-114 Hellfire missiles or other munitions.

- RQ-4 Global Hawk

Unarmed very long range strategic reconnaissance UAV.

- MQ-9 Reaper

Hunter-killer UAV designed for long-endurance, high-altitude surveillance. The MQ-9 carries a variety of weapons including the GBU-12 Paveway II laser-guided bomb, the AGM-114 Hellfire II air-to-ground missiles, the AIM-9 Sidewinder and recently, the GBU-38 JDAM (Joint Direct Attack Munition). Tests are underway to allow for the addition of the AIM-92 Stinger air-to-air missile.

- RQ-11B Raven

Small hand-launched remote-controlled unmanned aerial vehicle.

- YMQ-18A Hummingbird (Helicopter)

Under development by Boeing and DARPA.

- RQ-170 Sentinel

Unarmed flying wing design stealth reconnaissance UAV.

- RQ-180

Unarmed flying wing design stealth reconnaissance UAV.

- Scan Eagle

Unarmed remote sensing UAV, providing real-time direct situational awareness and force protection information for Air Force security forces expeditionary teams.

- Wasp III

Unarmed remote sensing UAV, providing real-time direct situational awareness and target information for Air Force Special Operations Command Battlefield Airmen.

== See also ==
- List of United States Army Air Forces reconnaissance units
- List of United States Air Force reconnaissance squadrons
