= Douglas David Higham =

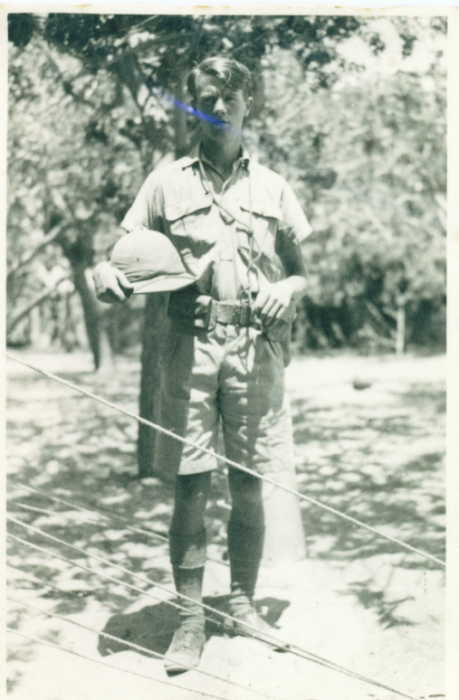
- Born: 13 January 1920; Wigan, United Kingdom
- Died: 20 April 1986 (aged 66); Wigan, United Kingdom
- Military career
- Allegiance: United Kingdom
- Branch: Royal Air Force
- Service number: 53671
- Unit: No. 230 Squadron RAF / No. 514 Squadron RAF
- Awards: D.F.C.
- Other work: Florist

Douglas David Higham (13 January 1920 – 20 April 1986) was a florist from Wigan, Lancashire.

Higham was born on 13 January 1920 in Wigan, Lancashire. He was one of six brothers who joined the services during World War 2, all of whom survived the war. He served the first part of the war in Coastal Command flying in Short Sunderland flying boats for No. 230 Squadron RAF as an air gunner. He later transferred to No. 514 Squadron RAF flying in Lancaster Bombers as a rear gunner from Waterbeach. In total Higham completed 156 missions during the war and was awarded the Distinguished Flying Cross.

== Personal life ==
After the war Higham settled in Wigan and started a successful fruit and florist business.

In 1963 Higham had his D.F.C. stolen from his house in Pemberton. In December 2017 it was finally bought back from a dealer by his son John Higham

Douglas Higham died of lung cancer on 20 Apr 1986

== Honours and awards ==
- Distinguished Flying Cross (United Kingdom)
