= No. 98 Squadron RAF =

Defunct flying squadron of the Royal Air Force

- Active: August 1917 – March 1919; February 1936 – July 1941; September 1942 – July 1957; August 1959 – February 1976
- Country: United Kingdom
- Branch: Royal Air Force
- Motto(s): Never failing
- Battle honours: Western Front 1918; Amiens; Lys; Atlantic 1940–1941; Fortress Europe 1940–44; Normandy 1944; France & Germany 1944–45; Rhine

Insignia
- Squadron Badge heraldry: Cerberus. The squadron claims to have barred the way (front and rear) during the German retreat in 1918 and so considered Cerberus, as the watchdog of Hades, a suitable badge.
- Squadron Codes: VO, OE

Aircraft flown
- Bomber: Airco DH.9; B-25 Mitchell

No. 98 Squadron was a Royal Air Force bomber squadron during World War I and World War II. It flew fighter-bombers post-war, and converted to fighters in 1955. Reformed as a ballistic missile unit between 1959 and 1963, its final incarnation was as a radar calibration unit. It was disbanded in 1976.

== History ==
=== World War I ===
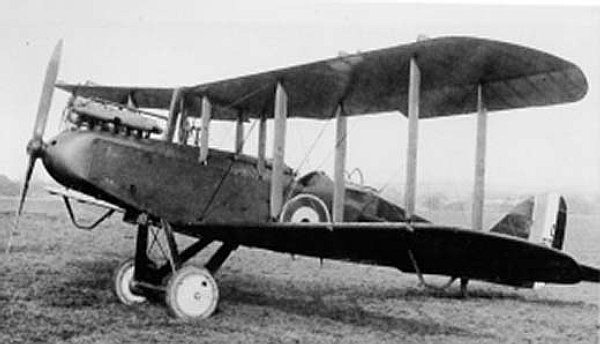
Airco DH.9

No. 98 Squadron RFC was formed on 30 August 1917 at RFCS Harlaxton, Lincolnshire, but soon moved to Old Sarum, Wiltshire. As a day-bombing unit equipped with the Airco DH.9, it moved to Northern France in April 1918, immediately seeing action during the Battle of the Lys, and then during the Second Battle of the Marne and the Battle of Amiens. From 1 November 1918 the squadron was employed chiefly with reconnaissance work, and after the Armistice acted mainly as a holding unit for disbanding DH-9 squadrons. The Squadron returned to England on 20 March 1919, and was disbanded four days later.

During its active service in France the Squadron claimed 40 enemy aircraft destroyed, 35 'driven out of control', and 4 'driven down'. Thirteen aircraft of the Squadron were shot down over enemy territory, and another 13 declared missing; ten crashed or crash-landed in Allied territory and about 31 were damaged or destroyed in accidents. Nineteen men were killed in action, 22 were reported missing, 14 were wounded, 13 injured in crashes, 16 taken prisoner and five accidentally killed.

=== Reformation ===
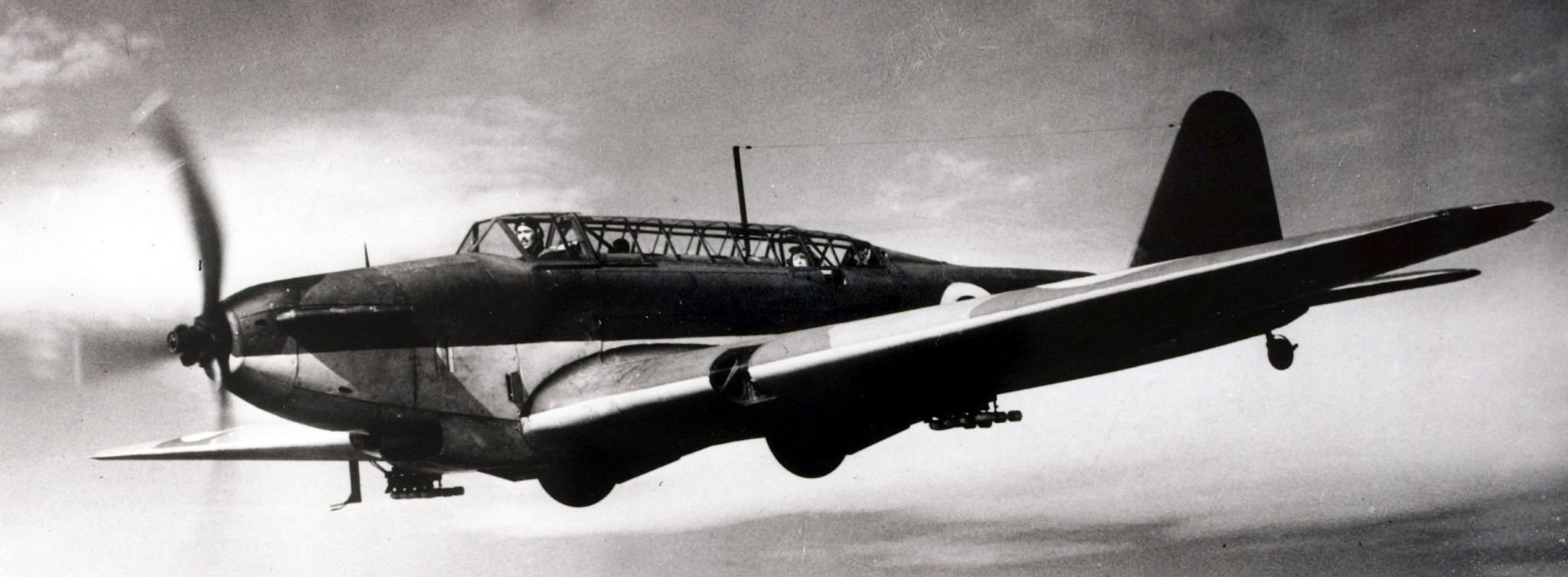
Fairey Battle

No. 98 Squadron was reformed on 17 February 1936 at RAF Abingdon as a day-bomber squadron equipped with the Hawker Hind. In August it moved to RAF Hucknall, transferring from 1 Group to 2 Group, and in 1938 was re-equipped with the Fairey Battle.

=== World War II ===
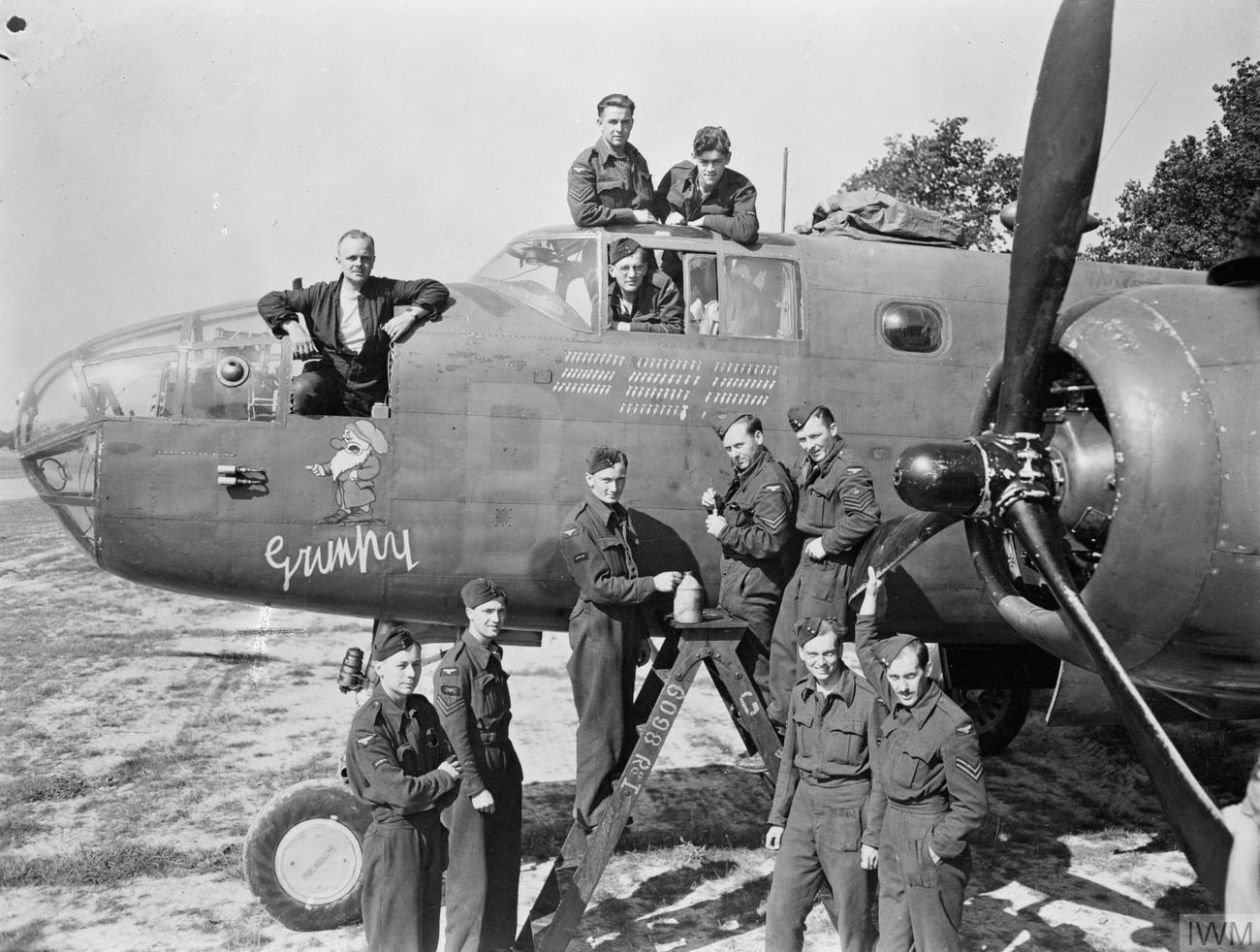
98 Squadron Mitchell III "Grumpy" at RAF Dunsfold

During the first nine months of World War II it served as a reserve squadron and from April–June 1940 was based at Nantes, France, though it flew no combat missions. Evacuated back to England during the Battle of France, the Squadron lost 90 of its personnel when the ship RMS Lancastria was bombed and sunk off Saint-Nazaire on 17 June 1940.

After re-assembling at Gatwick in July 1940, the Squadron was attached to Coastal Command and stationed at RAF Kaldadarnes in Iceland, for coastal patrol and anti-submarine duties. The Squadron supplemented its Fairey Battles with a few Hawker Hurricane fighter aircraft in June 1940 but was disbanded on 15 July 1941 passing its aircraft to the newly established No. 1523 Flight. In August 1999, melting ice on a remote glacier on Iceland revealed the wreck of Battle P2330 and its crew, the aircraft having disappeared whilst on a ferry flight from Kaldadarnes on 26 May 1941. The remains of the four airmen on board, two crew and two passengers, were recovered and buried at the Fossvogur War Cemetery in Reykjavik on 27 August 2000.

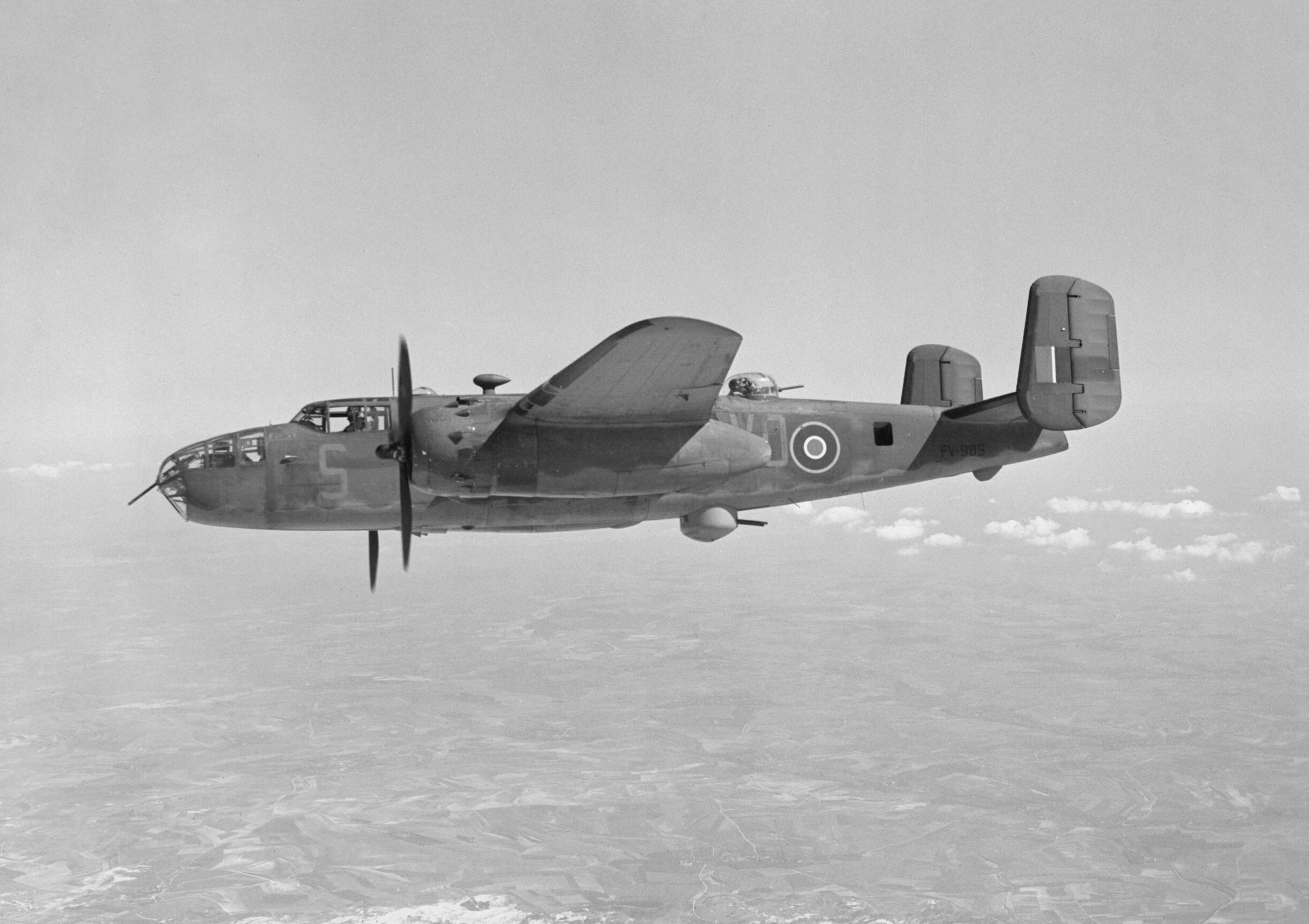
A 98 Sqn Mitchell returning from France, 19 April 1944.

No. 98 Squadron reformed on 12 September 1942 at RAF West Raynham as a bomber squadron of 2 Group, flying the North American Mitchell II. Relocating to RAF Foulsham in mid-October, the Squadron continued training on the Mitchell, being declared operational on 8 December 1942, at first flying Air Sea Rescue (ASR) missions. On 22 January 1943 the Squadron made its first attack on the enemy, when six Mitchells from 98 Squadron and six from No. 180 Squadron (also flying its first combat mission), with an escort of Mustang fighters from 169 Squadron, attacked oil installations at Terneuzen, Belgium. One 98 Squadron Mitchell was shot down by German anti-aircraft fire while two of 180 Squadron's aircraft together with two 169 Squadron Mustangs were shot down by Focke-Wulf Fw 190 fighters. Following this inauspicious debut, 98 Squadron returned to ASR missions while modifications were made to the Mitchell's defensive gun turrets, the Squadron returning to combat on 13 May when six aircraft attacked railway marshalling yards at Boulogne. In August 1943 the Squadron moved to RAF Dunsfold to take part in pre-invasion attacks on Northern France and on V1 flying bomb launching sites in the Pas-de-Calais. After the Normandy landings the Squadron operated in close support of the advancing Allied armies, and from October 1944 was based at Melsbroek near Brussels, Belgium, moving to Achmer, near Osnabrück, Germany, just days prior to VE Day.

=== Cold War ===
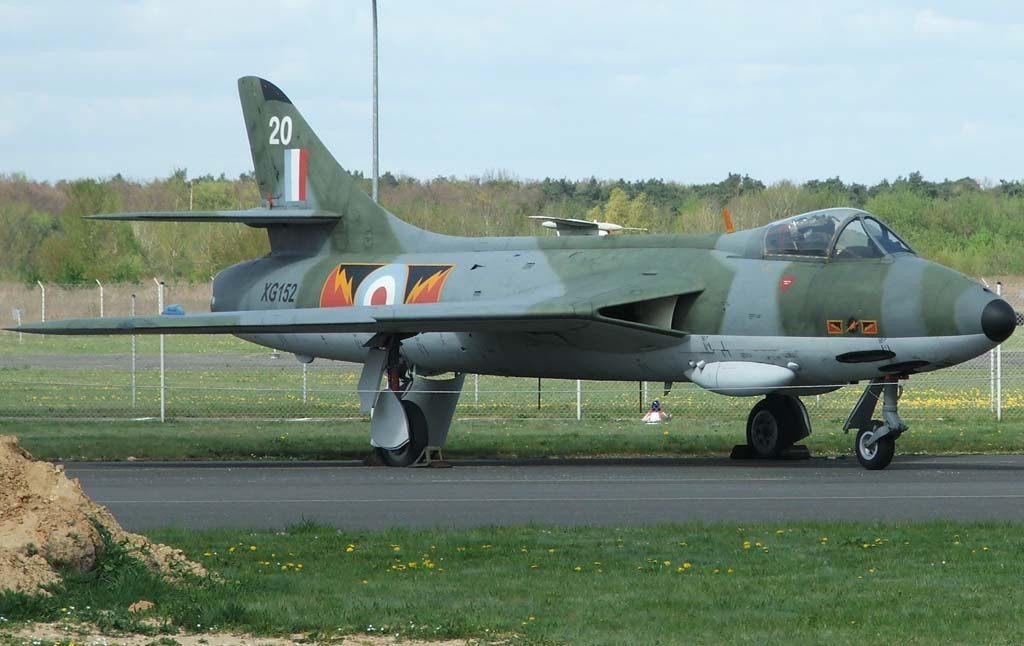
Hawker Hunter

After the war the Squadron remained with the British Air Forces of Occupation in Germany until 1957. It converted to the de Havilland Mosquito in September 1945, and in February 1951, received de Havilland Vampire fighter-bombers, replacing these with the Venom in 1953. In April 1955 the Squadron received the Hawker Hunter and became a day fighter unit until disbanding on 15 July 1957.

After training at Vandenberg Air Force Base, the squadron was reformed – as 98(SM) Sqn. – on 1 August 1959 as one of 20 Strategic Missile (SM) squadrons associated with Project Emily. The squadron was equipped with three Thor Intermediate range ballistic missiles and based at RAF Driffield.

In October 1962, during the Cuban Missile Crisis, the squadron was kept at full readiness, with the missiles aimed at strategic targets in the USSR. The squadron was disbanded on 18 April 1963 with the termination of the Thor Program in Britain.

The following day the radar calibration unit No. 245 Squadron at RAF Tangmere was renumbered as No. 98 Squadron. In October it moved its Canberras to RAF Watton. In April 1969, it moved to RAF Cottesmore, and was finally disbanded on 27 February 1976 when the colours were laid-up in the RAF Chapel of St Nicholas' Church, Cottesmore, Rutland.

== Bibliography ==
- Bowyer, Michael J. F. (1974). 2 Group R.A.F.: A Complete History, 1936–1945. London: Faber & Faber. ISBN 0-571-09491-0.
- Crabb, Brian James (2002). The Forgotten Tragedy. The story of the sinking of HMT Lancastria. Donington: Shaun Tyas. ISBN 1-900289-50-4.
- Chorlton, Martyn (November 2013). "Never Failing!". Aeroplane. 41 (11): 34–40. ISSN 0143-7240.
- Halley, James J. (1980). The Squadrons of the Royal Air Force. Tonbridge, Kent, UK: Air-Britain (Historians) Ltd. ISBN 0-85130-083-9.
- Richards, Denis (1995). The Hardest Victory: RAF Bomber Command in the Second World War. London: Coronet Books. ISBN 0-340-61720-9.
