= John C. Morgan =

United States Air Force Medal of Honor recipient (1914–1991)

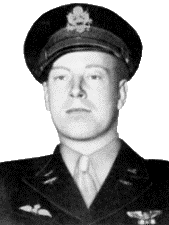
- Military photo of John C . Morgan
- Born: August 24, 1914; Vernon, Texas, US
- Died: January 17, 1991 (aged 76); Papillion, Nebraska, US
- Burial place: Arlington National Cemetery
- Military career
- Allegiance: United States of America
- Branch: Royal Canadian Air Force; United States Air Force
- Service years: 1941 – 1943 (Canada); 1943 – 1945, 1950 – 1953 (USA)
- Rank: Sergeant (Canada); Lieutenant Colonel (USA)
- Nickname: "Red"
- Units: 326th BS, 92nd BG
- Conflicts: World War II
- Awards: Medal of Honor; Air Medal (3)

John Cary "Red" Morgan (August 24, 1914 – January 17, 1991) was a United States Army Air Forces pilot in World War II who received the Medal of Honor for his actions during a 1943 bombing run over Germany, which also inspired the character of 2nd Lieutenant Jesse Bishop in the novel and film Twelve O'Clock High.

== Background ==
Born August 24, 1914, in Vernon, Texas, son of attorney Samuel A. Morgan Sr. and Verna Johnson Morgan, Morgan graduated from a military school in 1931 then attended several colleges, including Amarillo College, New Mexico Military Institute, West Texas State Teachers College, and the University of Texas at Austin. While at Texas he learned to fly aircraft, and in 1934 dropped out of college. He worked in the Fiji Islands as a foreman on a pineapple plantation until 1938, when he returned to enlist as an aviation cadet in the U.S. Army Air Corps. However, because of his poor education record, he was refused enlistment. Working at an oil-drilling site for Texaco, Morgan suffered a broken neck in an industrial accident, and as a result was later classified 4-F by the Selective Service System.

== Military service ==
In August, 1941, Morgan joined the Royal Canadian Air Force, and after completion of flight training in Saskatchewan, Ontario, and RAF Church Lawford, England, was posted as a Sergeant Pilot with RAF Bomber Command. On March 23, 1943, he was transferred to the U.S. Army Air Forces as a Flight Officer and assigned to the 92nd Bomb Group's 326th Bomb Squadron, RAF Alconbury, England.

Morgan, on his fifth U.S. mission, was co-pilot of a crew flying a B-17F, ser. no. 42-29802, to a target in Hanover, Germany, on July 26, 1943 (not July 28 as reported by his award citation below). It was for his participation in this mission that he received the Medal of Honor (citation shown below in full), which was awarded on December 18, 1943.

=== Medal of Honor action ===
Morgan's experience began as his group formation neared the German coast. The B-17, nicknamed Ruthie II, was attacked by a large number of Focke-Wulf Fw 190 fighters and had part of its oxygen system to the gunners' positions in the rear of the aircraft knocked out. The first burst of fire also smashed the cockpit's windshield, damaged the interphone, and split open the skull of pilot Lt. Robert Campbell. The pilot's upper body slumped over his control wheel, causing it to start out of control. F/O Morgan seized the controls on his side and by sheer strength pulled the plane back into formation.

The disabled pilot continued to try to wrestle the controls away from Morgan and smashed at the co-pilot with his fists, knocking some teeth loose and blackening both his eyes. Meanwhile, the top turret gunner, Staff Sgt. Tyre Calhoun Weaver Jr, was also seriously injured when a 20 mm shell tore off his left arm at the shoulder. He fell out of the turret position, and was found by the navigator bleeding to death. The navigator, Lt. Keith Koske, bailed the gunner out of the aircraft in a successful effort to save his life.

Unknown to Morgan, the waist, tail and radio gunners became unconscious from lack of oxygen and were threatened with death by anoxia. Morgan, unable to call for assistance because of the damaged interphone, had to decide whether to turn back immediately or try to fly all the way to the target and back within the protection of the formation. He also had to decide whether or not to subject Campbell to anoxia by cutting off his oxygen to disable him. In spite of wild efforts by the fatally wounded pilot to seize the controls, Morgan chose to complete the mission and not cut off his pilot's oxygen supply.

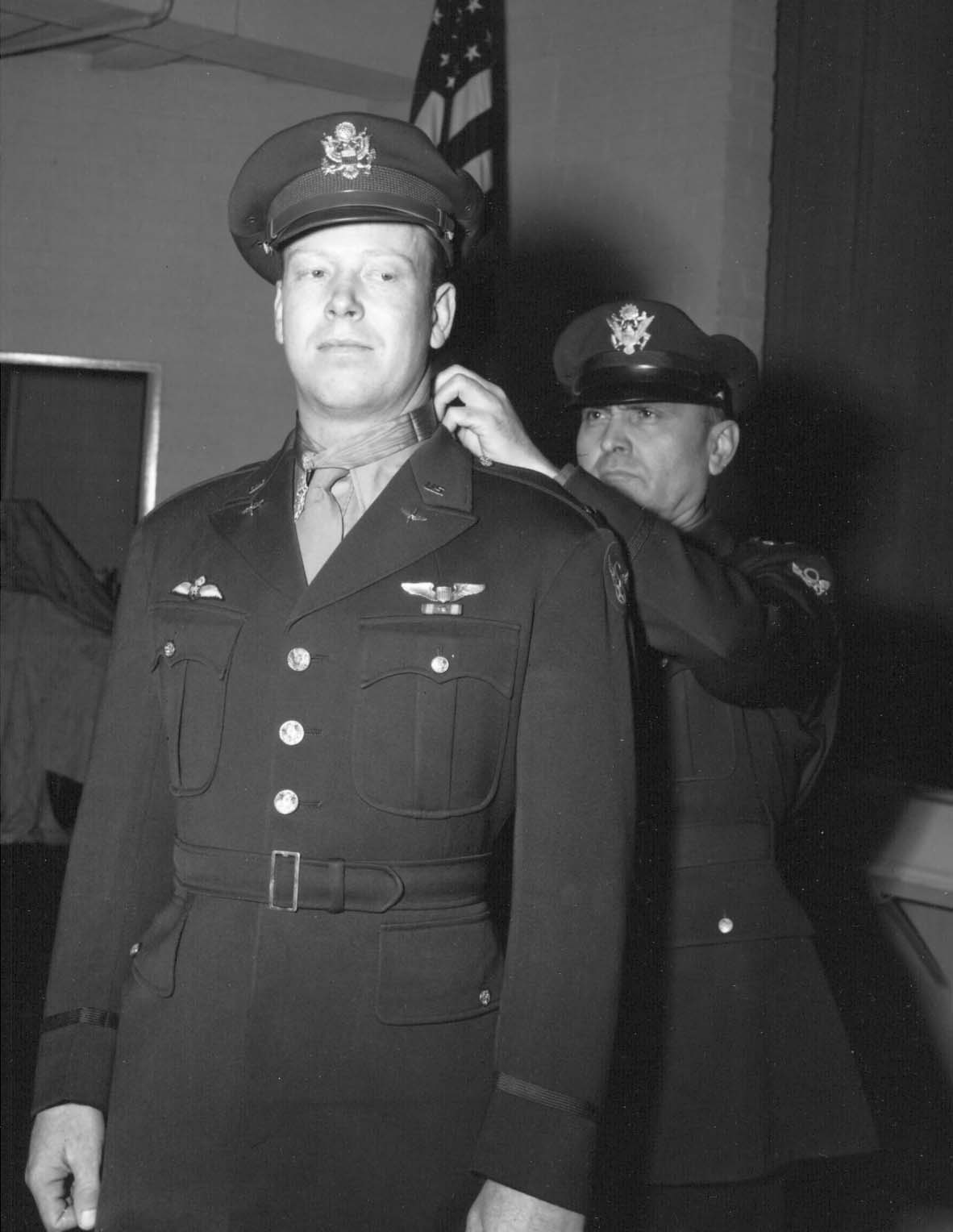
Medal of Honor presentation by Lt. Gen. Ira C. Eaker

For two hours he held position in the formation – flying with one hand, fighting off the pilot with the other. At length the navigator entered the flight deck and relieved the situation. The navigator and bombardier secured the dying pilot in the nose compartment of the airplane. F/O Morgan's B-17 reached the target at Hanover and successfully dropped its bombs. With all his fuel gauges reading empty, Morgan landed the bomber at RAF Foulsham. Lt. Campbell died an hour and half later, and the five surviving gunners recovered from various degrees of frostbite. The B-17 was declared damaged beyond economical repair and never flew again.

=== Capture ===
F/O Morgan transferred to the 482nd Bomb Group in October 1943 to fly B-17 H2X radar aircraft and was promoted to second lieutenant in November. He remained on combat duty, flying in 25½ missions.

On March 6, 1944, Morgan, now a first lieutenant, was the co-pilot on a B-17, ser. no. 42-3491, flown by Major Fred Rabo leading the first major USAAF attack against Berlin. The aircraft was shot down and six of the crew were killed. In his haste to escape the falling aircraft, Morgan bailed out without pausing to attach his chest-pack-type parachute. Free falling roughly 20,000 feet, he managed to attach the parachute pack and then successfully deploy it only about 500 feet above the ground. Morgan, Rabo and two others were captured. Morgan was held in Stalag Luft I, Barth, Germany, for the remainder of the war, the only person to become a POW after being awarded the Medal of Honor.

== Post-war career ==
In 1948 Sy Bartlett and Beirne Lay, Jr. published their novel Twelve O'Clock High and used Morgan as a model for a primary character, Lt. Jesse Bishop. The wording of his actions appearing in his citation was used as dialogue in the script to describe the actions of Bishop under similar circumstances, and like Morgan, Bishop's character was awarded the Medal of Honor and later became a POW. The circumstances also became a featured part of the 1949 film adaptation.

After the war, Morgan returned to work for Texaco in California selling aviation fuel. Called back to active duty when the Korean War broke out, he took a leave of absence from Texaco (1950–53) and applied for combat duty. The Air Force denied his request but allowed him to fly cargo planes in the United States for two years. He completed his final year on active duty in the office of the Deputy Assistant Secretary of the Air Force. In 1957, he retired from the Air Force Reserves as a lieutenant colonel.

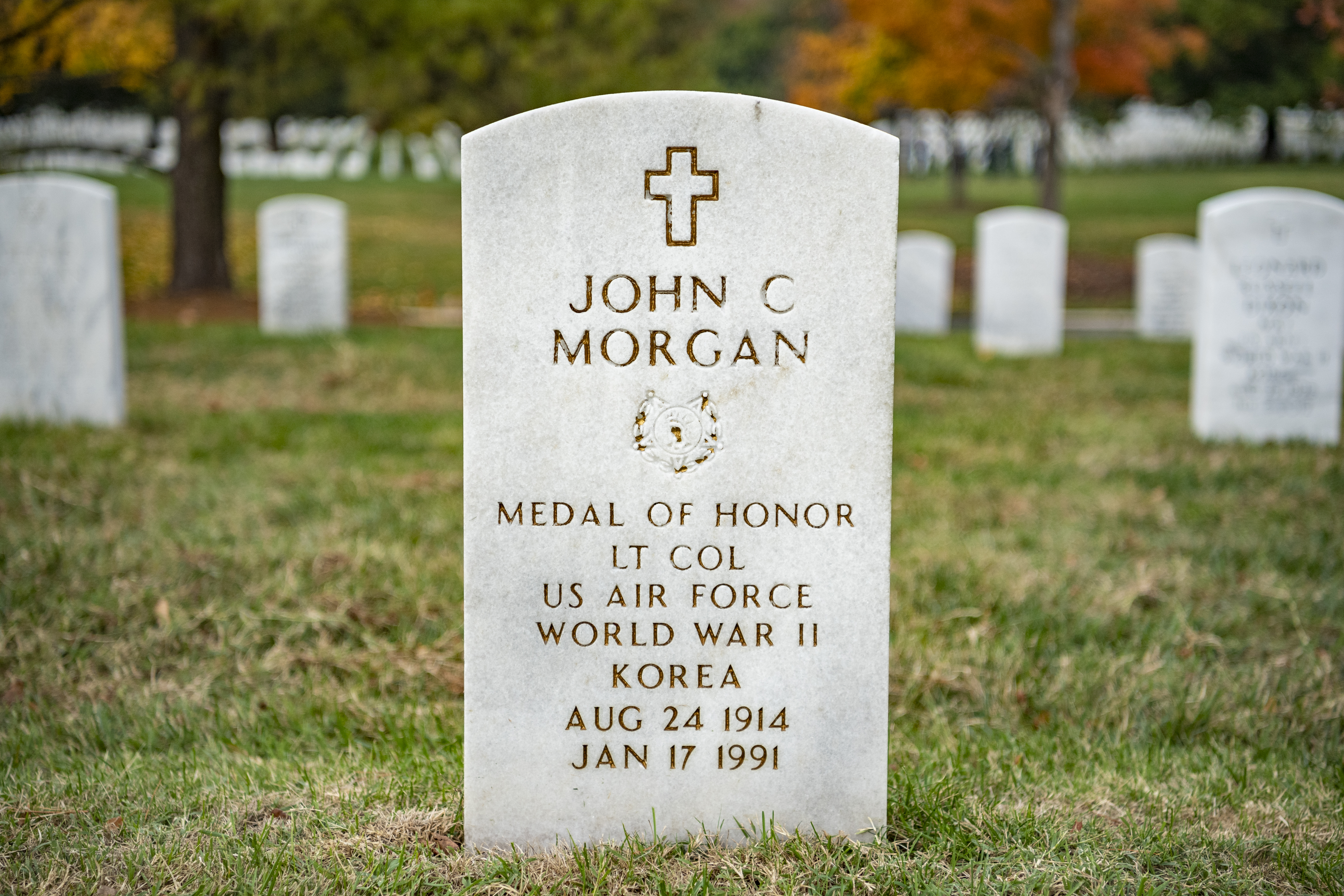
Morgan's grave at Arlington National Cemetery

Morgan died on January 17, 1991, from complications associated with Alzheimer's and a stroke. He is buried in section 59 at Arlington National Cemetery.

When questioned of his valor and heroism, Morgan replied, "There's no such thing as a hero. …I was pushed into circumstances where I was forced to act. You can never say how you're going to react to something until it happens, but I think most people would have done the same."

== Medal of Honor citation ==
Citation:

For conspicuous gallantry and intrepidity above and beyond the call of duty, while participating on a bombing mission over enemy-occupied continental Europe, 28 July 1943. Prior to reaching the German coast on the way to the target, the B17 aircraft in which 2d Lt. (sic) Morgan was serving as co-pilot was attacked by a large force of enemy fighters, during which the oxygen system to the tail, waist, and radio gun positions was knocked out. A frontal attack placed a cannon shell through the windshield, totally shattering it, and the pilot's skull was split open by the shell, leaving him in a crazed condition. The pilot fell over the steering wheel, tightly clamping his arms around it. 2d Lt. Morgan at once grasped the controls from his side and, by sheer strength, pulled the aircraft back into formation despite the frantic struggles of the semiconscious pilot. The interphone had been destroyed, rendering it impossible to call for help. At this time the top turret gunner fell to the floor and down through the hatch with his arm shot off at the shoulder and a gaping wound in his side. The waist, tail, and radio gunners had lost consciousness from lack of oxygen and, hearing no fire from their guns, the copilot believed they had bailed out. The wounded pilot still offered desperate resistance in his crazed attempts to fly the aircraft. There remained the prospect of flying to and over the target and back to a friendly base wholly unassisted. In the face of this desperate situation, 2d Lt. Officer Morgan made his decision to continue the flight and protect any members of the crew who might still be in the ship and for 2 hours he flew in formation with one hand at the controls and the other holding off the struggling pilot before the navigator entered the steering compartment and relieved the situation. The miraculous and heroic performance of 2d Lt. Morgan on this occasion resulted in the successful completion of a vital bombing mission and the safe return of his aircraft and crew.

== See also ==
- List of Medal of Honor recipients
