= No. 69 Squadron RAF =

Defunct flying squadron of the Royal Air Force

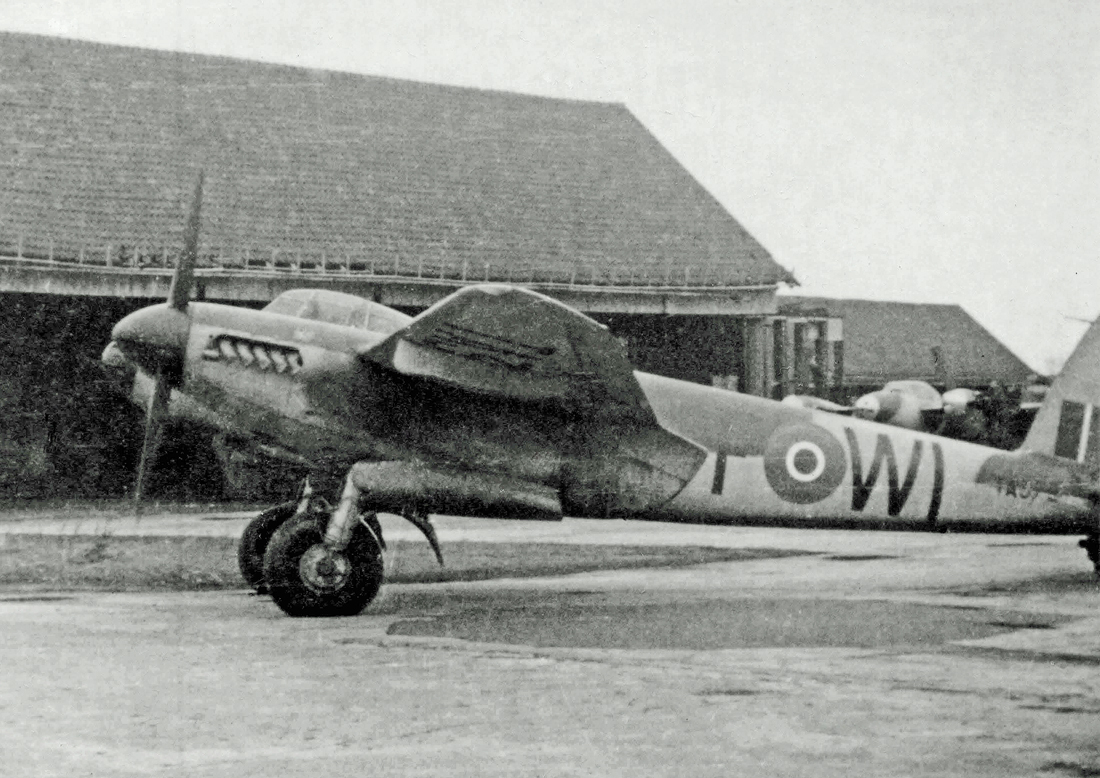
- 69 Squadron Mosquito FB.VI, coded 'WI-F', March 1946
- Active: 10 Jan 1941 – 6 August 1947; 1 October 1954 – 1 July 1958
- Country: United Kingdom
- Branch: Royal Air Force
- Motto(s): With vigilance we serve

Insignia
- Badge: In front of an anchor, a telescope.
- Codes: MJ Apr – Sep 1939; WI Aug 1945 – Mar 1946

No. 69 Squadron was a unit of the Royal Air Force. The designation has been used for two quite different units.

== History ==
No. 3 Squadron, Australian Flying Corps was formed at Point Cook, Victoria, Australia in 1916. To avoid confusion with No. 3 Squadron, RFC, it was known to the British military as "No. 69 Squadron RFC", although this terminology was never accepted by the squadron or the Australian Imperial Force.

=== Second World War ===
The squadron was "re-formed" on 10 January 1941 during World War II, when No. 431 (General Reconnaissance) Flight RAF, briefly re-designated as No. 1431 Flight RAF, on Malta became No. 69 Squadron. It carried out strategic reconnaissance missions mainly using Martin Marylands until May 1942 when Spitfires began to carry out all reconnaissance missions. These were later supplemented by Martin Baltimores for shipping reconnaissance and anti-submarine patrols until April 1944 when the squadron returned to the UK. Adrian Warburton was a notable pilot who served with the squadron during its service on Malta.

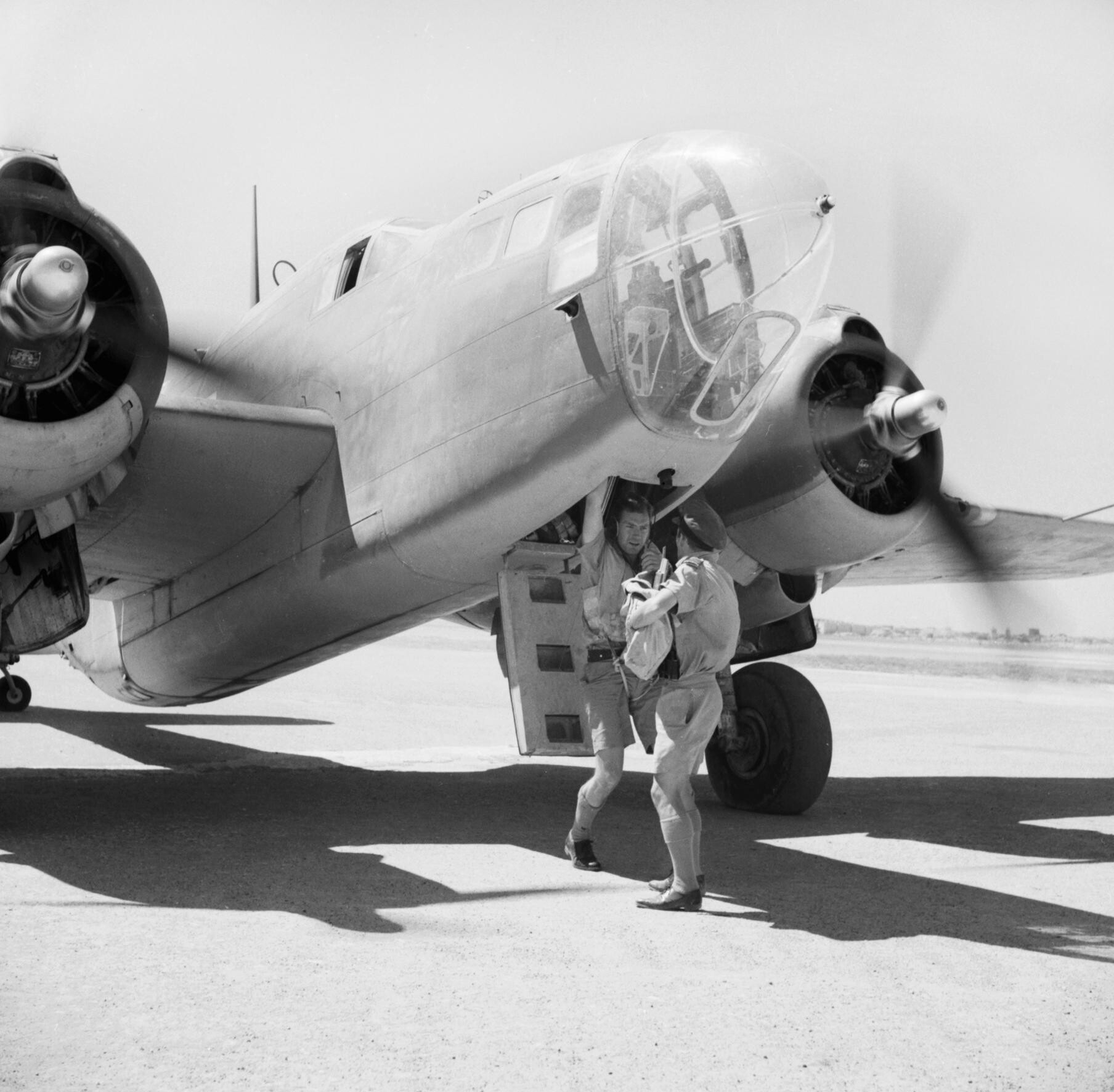
Martin Baltimore of No. 69 Squadron at Luqa, Malta, June 1942

No. 69 Squadron re-assembled at RAF Northolt on 5 May 1944 as part of No. 34 Wing of the RAF' Second Tactical Air Force equipped with Vickers Wellington XIIIs for night reconnaissance duties, beginning operations on the eve of D-Day, using flares to locate enemy troop movements. In September the squadron moved to France and Belgium until 7 May 1945. It disbanded on 7 August 1945.

On 8 August 1945, No. 613 Squadron at Cambrai-Epinoy, France, was renumbered No. 69 Squadron, flying Mosquito FB.VI fighter-bombers until it was again disbanded on 31 March 1946. The next day, 180 Squadron was renumbered No. 69 at Wahn again equipped with Mosquito light bombers until again disbanded on 6 November 1947.

The squadron flew from RAF Gutersloh in Germany briefly from 1954. No. 69 had been reformed on 5 May 1954 at RAF Laarbruch as a Canberra reconnaissance unit and remained in Germany until renumbered 39 Squadron on 1 July 1958.

== See also ==
- List of Royal Air Force aircraft squadrons

== Bibliography ==
- Halley, James J. (1988), The Squadrons of the Royal Air Force and Commonwealth 1918–1988, Tonbridge, Kent: Air-Britain (Historians) Ltd, ISBN 0-85130-164-9
- Jefford, C.G. RAF Squadrons, a Comprehensive Record of the Movement and Equipment of all RAF Squadrons and their Antecedents since 1912. Shrewsbury, Shropshire, UK: Airlife Publishing, 2001. ISBN 1-84037-141-2.
