= Reconnaissance aircraft =

Aircraft designed to observe enemy forces and facilities

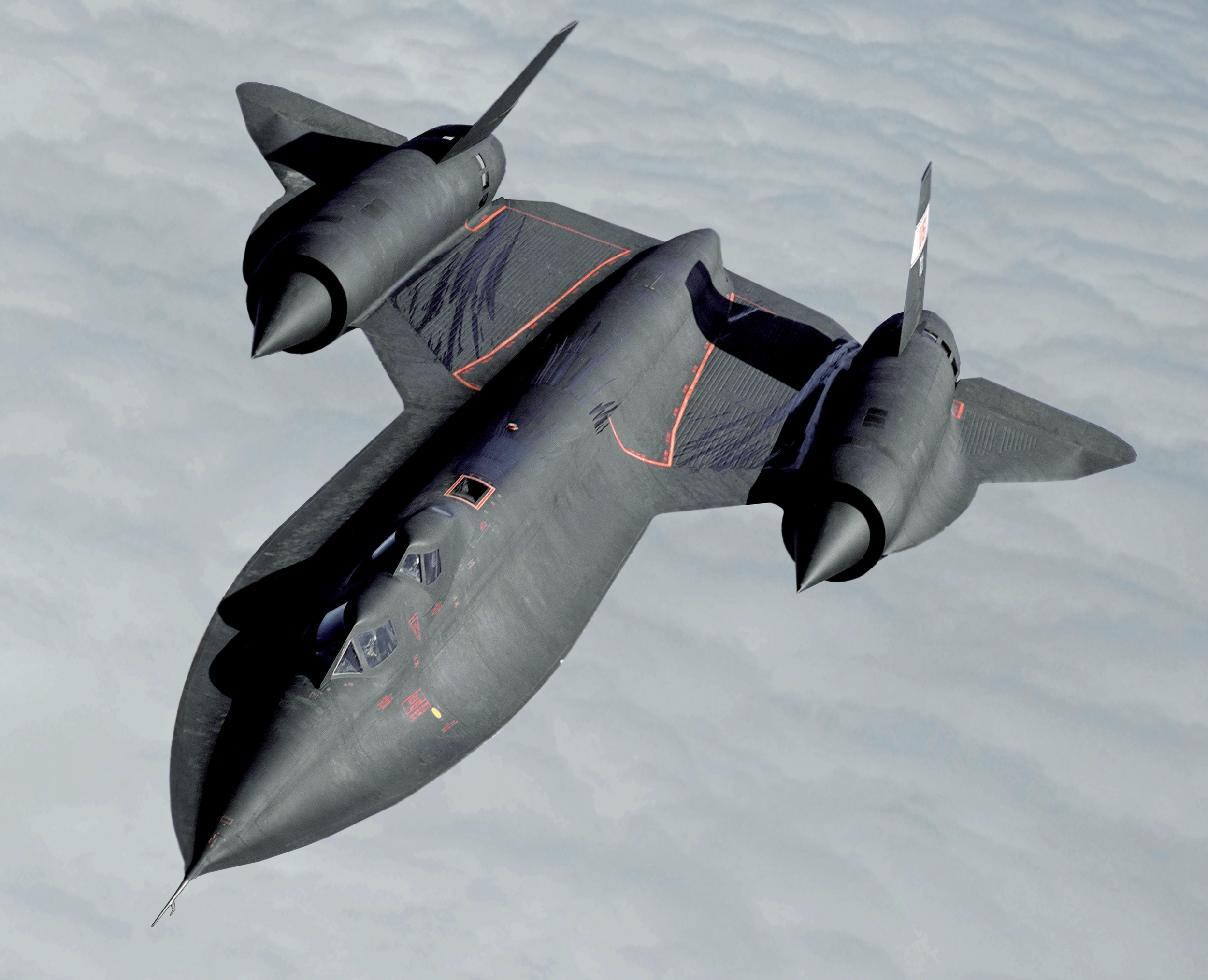
A USAF SR-71 high-altitude reconnaissance aircraft

A reconnaissance aircraft (colloquially, a spy plane) is a military aircraft designed or adapted to perform aerial reconnaissance with roles including collection of imagery intelligence (including using photography), signals intelligence, as well as measurement and signature intelligence. Modern technology has also enabled some aircraft and UAVs to carry out real-time surveillance in addition to general intelligence gathering.

Before the development of devices such as radar, military forces relied on reconnaissance aircraft for visual observation and scouting of enemy movement. An example is the PBY Catalina maritime patrol flying boat used by the Allies in World War II: a flight of U.S. Navy Catalinas spotted part of the Japanese fleet approaching Midway Island, beginning the Battle of Midway.

== History ==
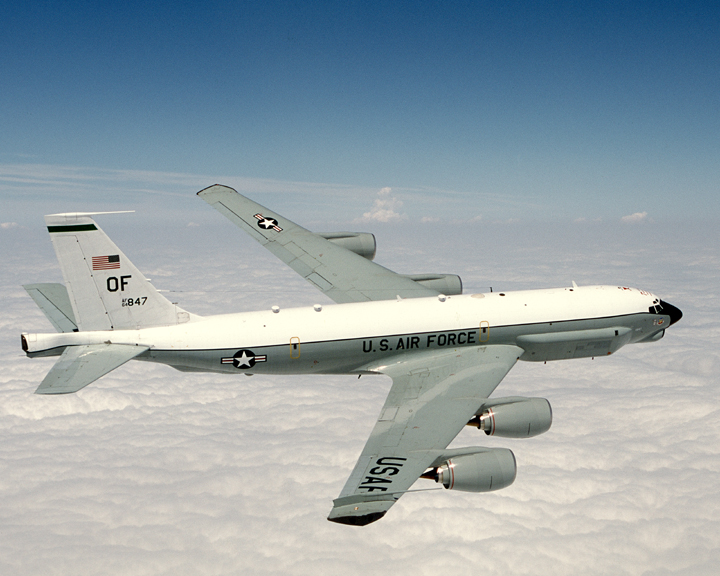
USAF's RC-135U Combat Sent reconnaissance (ELINT) aircraft

Prior to the 20th century, machines for powered and controllable flight were not available to military forces, but some attempts were made to use lighter than air craft. During the Napoleonic Wars and Franco-Prussian War, balloons were used for aerial reconnaissance by the French.

In World War I, aircraft were deployed during early phases of battle in reconnaissance roles as 'eyes of the army' to aid ground forces. Aerial reconnaissance from this time through 1945 was mostly carried out by adapted versions of standard fighters and bombers equipped with film cameras. Photography became the primary and best-known method of intelligence collection for reconnaissance aircraft by the end of World War II.

World War I also saw use of floatplanes to locate enemy warships. After the battle of Jutland demonstrated the limitations of seaplane tenders, provisions were made for capital ships to carry, launch, and recover observation seaplanes. These seaplanes could scout for enemy warships beyond the visual range of the ship's lookouts, and could spot the fall of shot during long range artillery engagements. Observation seaplanes were replaced by helicopters after World War II.

After World War II and during the Cold War the United States developed several dedicated reconnaissance aircraft designs, including the U-2 and SR-71, to monitor the nuclear arsenal of the Soviet Union. Other types of reconnaissance aircraft were built for specialized roles in signals intelligence and electronic monitoring, such as the RB-47, RB-57, Boeing RC-135 and the Ryan Model 147 drones. Soviet planes include the Myasishchev M-55.

Since the Cold War much of the strategic reconnaissance aircraft role has passed over to satellites, and the tactical role to unmanned aerial vehicles (UAVs). This has been proven in successful uses by the United States in Desert Storm operations.

== See also ==
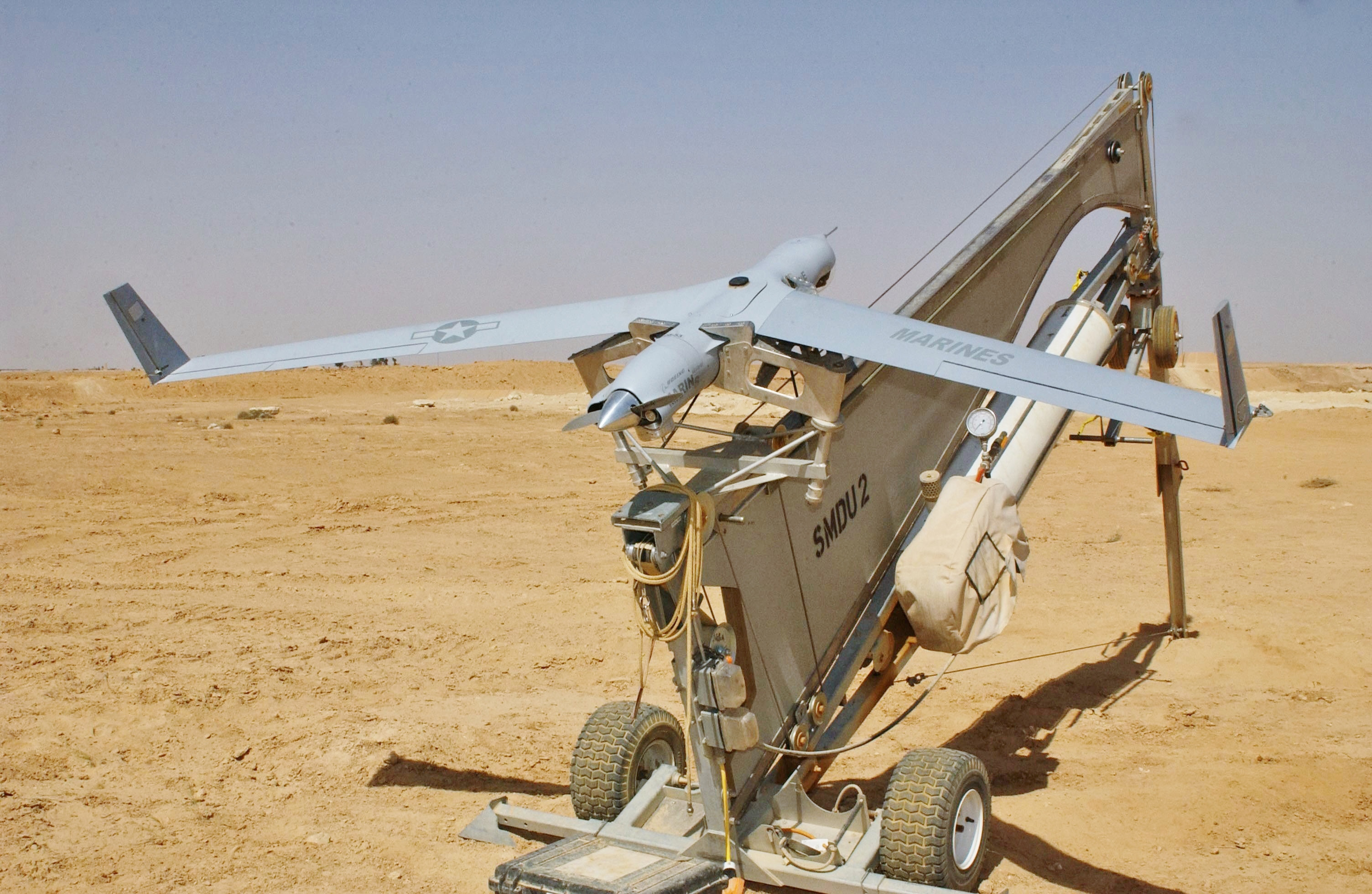
ScanEagle reconnaissance UAV on its catapult launcher

- Aerial reconnaissance
- Surveillance aircraft
- List of United States Air Force reconnaissance aircraft
- Maritime patrol aircraft
- Observation seaplane
