= No. 514 Squadron RAF =

Defunct flying squadron of the Royal Air Force

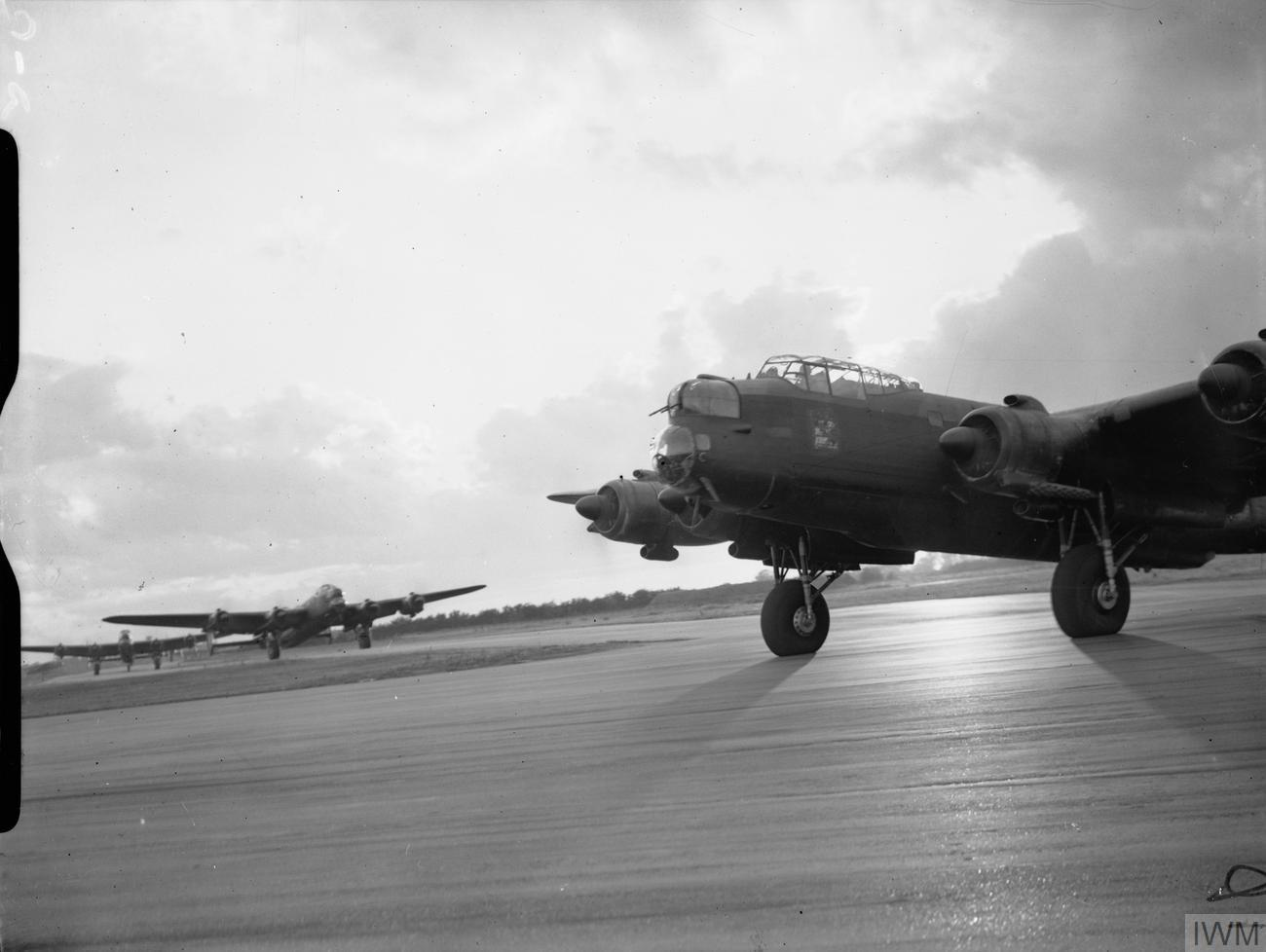
- No. 514 Squadron Avro Lancaster heavy bombers taxiing on the airfield at RAF Waterbeach
- Active: 1 September 1943 – 22 August 1945
- Country: United Kingdom
- Branch: Royal Air Force
- Type: Flying squadron
- Role: Bomber Squadron
- Part of: No. 3 Group RAF, Bomber Command
- Mottos: Latin: Nil Obstare Potest (Translation: "Nothing can withstand")

Insignia
- Squadron Badge heraldry: A cloud pierced by a sword The design indicates the function of the squadron, i.e. its role of a GH-equipped blind-bombing squadron
- Squadron Codes: JI (Sep 1943 – Aug 1945); A2 (Dec 1943 – Aug 1945, 'C' Flt only)

Aircraft flown
- Bomber: Avro Lancaster

No. 514 Squadron RAF (514 Sqn) was a bomber squadron of the Royal Air Force during the Second World War.

== History ==
Members of 514 Sqn were awarded 1 DSO, 84 DFCs, one Bar to the DFC and 26 DFMs.

514 Squadron was part of 3 Group, RAF Bomber Command. It operated between September 1943 and August 1945, initially from RAF Foulsham, and then, from December 1943 onward, from RAF Waterbeach in Cambridgeshire. 437 aircrew were killed flying with the Squadron.

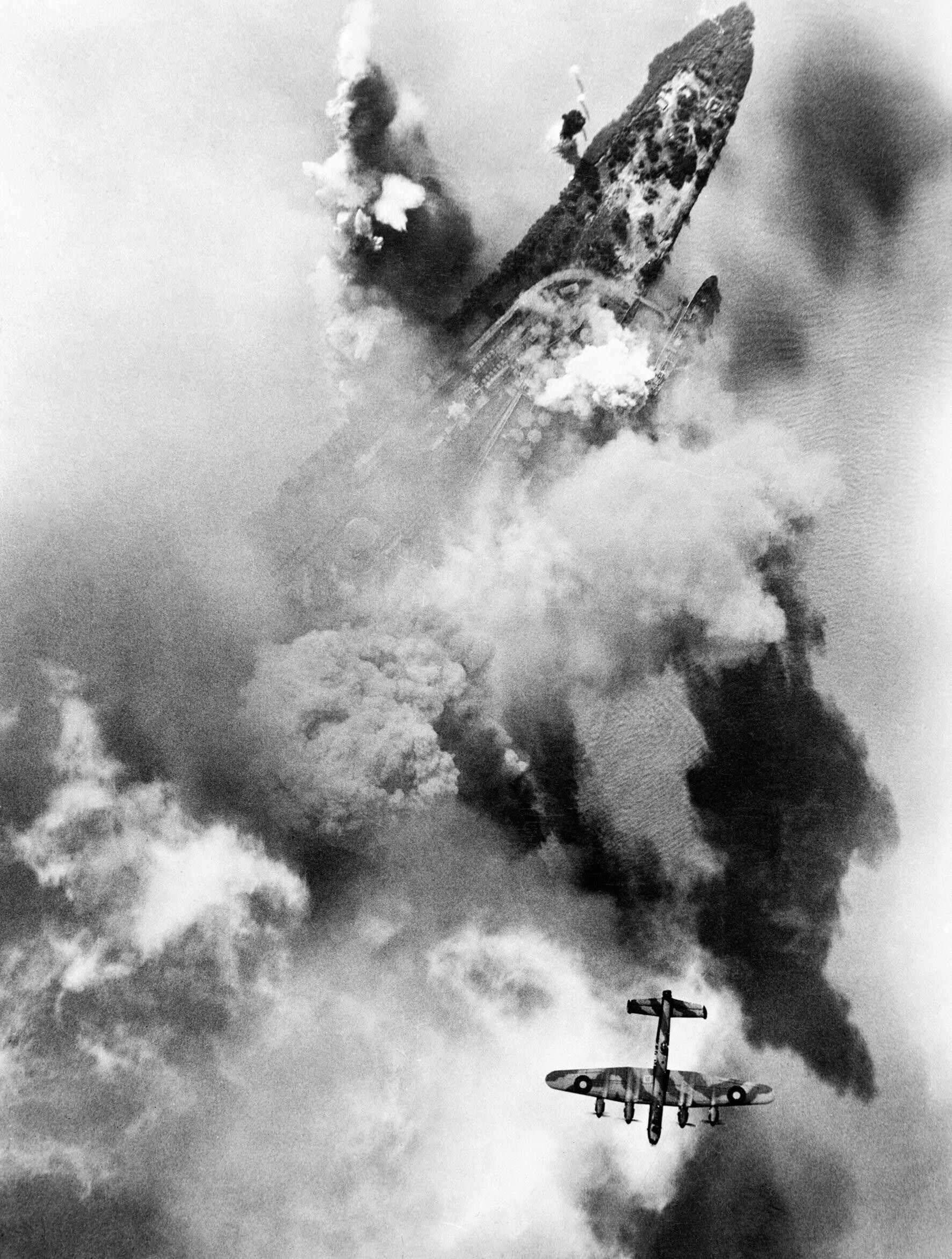
Avro Lancaster of No. 514 Squadron RAF during a Bombing raid on an oil storage depot at Bec d'Ambès, August 1944

== Aircraft operated ==
Aircraft operated by no. 514 Squadron RAF, data from
From	To	Aircraft	Version
September 1943	July 1944	Avro Lancaster	Mk.II
June 1944	August 1945	Avro Lancaster	Mks.I and III

== Squadron bases ==
Bases and airfields used by no. 514 squadron RAF, data from
From	To	Base
1 September 1943	23 November 1943	RAF Foulsham, Norfolk
23 November 1943	22 August 1945	RAF Waterbeach, Cambridgeshire

== Reunions ==
From 1988 to 2012, the Squadron held an annual reunion in June at Waterbeach Barracks hosted by the Royal Engineers. A service of remembrance was held in the parish church, and the BBMF Lancaster made a flypast over the former RAF airfield.

In 2013, following the barracks' closure, a reunion was held in the village on 15 June with the Lancaster flypast over the Recreation Ground.

In 2015, a reunion was again held in Waterbeach Barracks in a new community building.

== Museum ==
The 514 Squadron Association and the Army established a museum in Waterbeach Barracks in 1985. This museum closed in September 2012, as the barracks closed permanently in March 2013, although the contents have been saved. It expected that the new Waterbeach Military Heritage Museum will return to its building at the Barracks, and re-open in early summer 2016.

== See also ==
- List of Royal Air Force aircraft squadrons
