= No. 192 Squadron RAF =

Defunct flying squadron of the Royal Air Force

- Official squadron badge of No. 192 Squadron RAF
- Active: 5 Sep 1917 – Dec 1918; 4 Jan 1943 – 22 Aug 1945; 15 Jul 1951 – 21 Aug 1958
- Country: United Kingdom
- Branch: Royal Air Force
- Motto: Dare to Discover

Insignia
- Squadron Badge heraldry: In front of a flash of lightning, an owl's head affrontée
- Squadron Codes: DT

No. 192 Squadron was a Royal Air Force squadron operational during the First World War as a night training squadron and during the Second World War as a radar countermeasure unit. After the war the squadron served again in the Electronic Intelligence role, until disbanded in 1958.

== History ==
=== Formation in World War I ===
No. 192 Squadron was formed at Gainsborough, Lincolnshire on 5 September 1917 as a night training squadron operating the Royal Aircraft Factory FE.2b and FE.2d. The squadron moved to Newmarket, Suffolk in 1918 and was disbanded in December 1918.

=== Reformation in World War II ===
The squadron was re-formed on 4 January 1943 when No. 1474 Flight at RAF Gransden Lodge was re-numbered 192 (Special) Squadron. The squadron operated specially modified Vickers Wellingtons and de Havilland Mosquitos to identify German radar patterns and wavelengths. It also carried out similar missions over the Bay of Biscay and the Mediterranean. In April 1943 the squadron moved to RAF Feltwell in Norfolk and at the end of the year moved again to RAF Foulsham to operate with 100 (Bomber Support) Group. During bomber raids the aircraft would provide countermeasures against German radars. The squadron disbanded at the end of the Second World War on 22 August 1945 to form the basis of the Central Signals Establishment and the Radio Warfare Establishment (RWE).

=== Reformed again in the Cold War ===
On 15 July 1951, the squadron reformed at RAF Watton as part of that same Central Signals Establishment for Operational Signals Research. Despite the word 'Research' in the role, the squadron continued with its traditional Electronic Signals Intelligence (ELINT) role. The squadron also used the Boeing Washington and English Electric Canberra in the ELINT role. The squadron disbanded on 21 August 1958 at Watton when it was renumbered to 51 Squadron.

== Aircraft operated ==
From	To	Aircraft	Variant
Sep 1917	Dec 1918	Royal Aircraft Factory F.E.2	F.E.2b and 2d
Jan 1943	Feb 1943	Vickers Wellington	Mks.Ic, III
Jan 1943	Mar 1945	Vickers Wellington	Mk.X
Jan 1943	Mar 1945	de Havilland Mosquito	Mk.IV
Mar 1943	Jul 1943	Handley Page Halifax	Mk.II
Jul 1943	Mar 1944	Handley Page Halifax	Mk.V
Mar 1944	Aug 1945	Handley Page Halifax	Mk.III
Feb 1945	Aug 1945	de Havilland Mosquito	Mk.XVI
Aug 1945	Aug 1945	Airspeed Oxford	
Aug 1945	Aug 1945	Avro Anson	Mk.I
Jul 1951	Sep 1952	de Havilland Mosquito	PR.34
Jul 1951	Mar 1953	Avro Lincoln	B.2
Apr 1952	Feb 1958	Boeing Washington	B.1
Jan 1953	Aug 1958	English Electric Canberra	B.2
Apr 1954	Apr 1956	Vickers Varsity	T.1
Jul 1954	Aug 1958	English Electric Canberra	B.6 (Mod)
Jul 1957	Aug 1958	de Havilland Comet	C.2R or R.2

== See also ==
- List of Royal Air Force aircraft squadrons
