= RAF Foulsham =

Former RAF station in Norfolk, England

RAF Foulsham
- Norwich, Norfolk in England

Site information
- Type: Royal Air Force station Parent Station 1942-
- Code: FU
- Owner: Ministry of Defence
- Operator: Royal Air Force
- Controlled by: RAF Bomber Command * No. 2 Group RAF * No. 3 Group RAF * No. 100 (BS) Group RAF

Location
- Location in Norfolk RAF Foulsham (the United Kingdom)
- Coordinates: 52°48′06″N 001°00′23″E

Site history
- Built: 1942
- Built by: Kirk & Kirk Ltd
- In use: May 1942-1945
- Battles/wars: European theatre of World War II

Airfield information
- Elevation: 53 metres (174 ft) AMSL
Runways
Direction	Length and surface
00/00	Tarmac
00/00	Tarmac
00/00	Tarmac

Royal Air Force Foulsham, more commonly known as RAF Foulsham is a former Royal Air Force station, a military airfield, located 15 miles north-west of Norwich, in the English county of Norfolk, East Anglia, from 1942 to 1945.

== History ==
RAF Foulsham at Foulsham in Norfolk was built between 1941 and 1942 for No. 2 Group RAF Bomber Command and opened in May 1942 and declared operational on 26 June 1942. Foulsham was one of the few airfields to be fitted with FIDO in 1944, a fog dispersal system which used fires at the sides of the runways.

The airfield was equipped with three tarmac and woodchip runways and 37 hardstandings. It also had 9 hangars, five of which were built for storing Airspeed Horsa glider aircraft ready for D Day.

The first residents were No. 98 Squadron RAF and No. 180 Squadron RAF, flying North American Mitchell bombers. The station was then used by No. 3 Group RAF who used Short Stirling and Avro Lancaster bombers. No. 514 Squadron RAF was formed at Foulsham, flying Lancasters.

The station then became the home of No. 192 Squadron RAF, which was part of No. 100 Group RAF, an electronic warfare unit which had its headquarters at Bylaugh Hall. 192 Squadron was later joined by another 100 Group squadron, No. 462 Squadron, Royal Australian Air Force, which operated Handley Page Halifax aircraft.

During the Second World War, 45 aircraft based at RAF Foulsham were lost. Many aircraft made emergency landings at Foulsham, including USAAF Boeing B-17 Flying Fortress F "Ruthie II", which made an emergency landing there in 1943 after an epic return flight for which co-pilot John C. Morgan was awarded the highest U.S. medal, the Medal of Honor. The airfield remained the property of the Ministry of Defence until the 1980s.

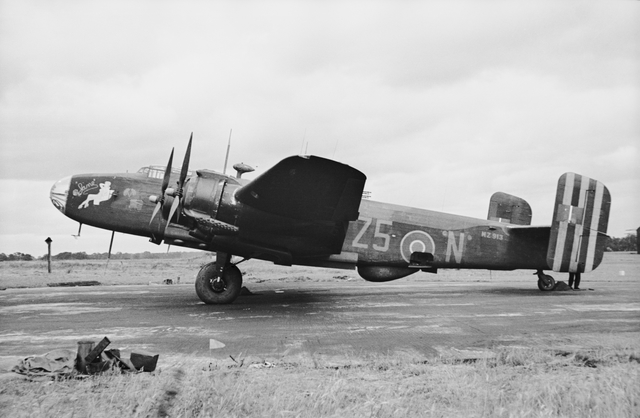
An Australian Halifax at RAF Foulsham in 1945

== Based units ==
- No. 12 Heavy Glider Maintenance Section
- No. 16 Maintenance Unit RAF
- No. 98 Squadron RAF
- No. 99 Maintenance Unit RAF
- No. 180 Squadron RAF (1942-3)
- No. 192 Squadron RAF (1943-5)
- No. 462 Squadron RAAF (1944-5)
- No. 514 Squadron RAF (1943)
- No. 1473 (Radio Countermeasures) Flight RAF
- No. 1508 (Beam Approach Training) Flight RAF
- No. 1678 Heavy Conversion Unit RAF (1943)
- No. 4261 Anti-Aircraft Flight RAF Regiment
- Bomber Support Development Unit RAF

== See also ==
- List of former Royal Air Force stations
- List of Royal Air Force aircraft squadrons
