= No. 180 Squadron RAF =

Defunct flying squadron of the Royal Air Force

- Active: 11 September 1942 – 31 March 1946
- Country: United Kingdom
- Branch: Royal Air Force
- Mottos: Latin: Suaviter in modo fortier in re (Agreeable in manner, forcible in act)

Insignia
- Squadron Badge: Two arrows behind a velvet glove.
- Squadron code: EV (September 1942 – March 1946)

No. 180 Squadron RAF was a Royal Air Force squadron that flew medium bombers in World War II.

== History ==
=== Formation in World War II ===
The Squadron was equipped with Mitchells at RAF West Raynham. It then flew its first raid from RAF Foulsham and suffered heavy losses including the aircraft of the squadron commander. After supporting the breakout from the Normandy beachhead in June 1944, the squadron re-located to Melsbroek, Belgium. It supported the allied advance across Europe and from April 1945 it operated from Achmer, Germany.

=== Post war ===
The Mitchell aircraft were replaced with Mosquitos in September 1945 and the squadron moved to Wahn. It was disbanded upon re-numbering as No. 69 Squadron RAF on 31 March 1946.

== Aircraft operated ==
Aircraft operated by no. 180 Squadron RAF
From	To	Aircraft	Variant
Sep 1942	Apr 1945	North American B-25 Mitchell	II
Dec 1944	Sep 1945	North American B-25 Mitchell	III
Sep 1945	Mar 1946	de Havilland Mosquito	XVI
