= Ferret mission =

Covert aerial reconnaissance mission

A ferret mission is a covert aerial reconnaissance mission that detects radar frequencies and strength. The name is taken from methods used by ferrets to seek out other animals' habitats.

== History ==
=== Germany ===
The first ferret mission was by the Graf Zeppelin on September 22, 1938, flying over the Czech border, on an 11 hour flight. Another 30 hour flight took place on April 14, 1939, and another of 28 hours on June 15, 1939. A 44 hour flight was over the Dutch Frisian Islands and the North Sea on July 12, 1939, and a 17 hour flight over the Poland border on July 18, 1939, and a 20 hour flight on July 22, 1939.

On May 30, 1939 the 776-foot LZ 130 Graf Zeppelin flew up the North Sea to the Shetland Islands, searching for any radar frequencies, but the Germans did not believe that British radar was sufficiently advanced, or much too crude, to be effective to track aircraft.

But, the Graf Zeppelin had been, nonetheless, precisely tracked by British radar all the way to the Shetland Islands and back, although the German equipment onboard was not adequately working on this flight.

Another similar flight was made on August 2, 1939, on its Flight 24, with commander Albert Sammt, from Cuxhaven. This time, British radar did not sufficiently spot the airship, but it was visually sighted. The airship flew gracefully up the eastern coast looking for BBC transmitters and RAF navigational transmitters, at 20 to 52 MHz frequencies. The frequency that was found, was thought, by Ernst Breuning, to be from an ionosphere experiment in Germany. The German Freya radar worked at 120-130 MHz. The British radar worked on 12 metres, around 25 Hz, and the Germans had looked for a much shorter wavelength, and found nothing.

Flt Lt Walter Pretty at Fighter Command Operations Room, realised the object seen on radar was from an airship. Sqn Ldr Findlay Crerar, at RAF Dyce at Aberdeen, took off with another aircraft of 612 Sqn, and photographed the airship.

=== United Kingdom ===
The first ferret mission occurred in December 1942, in Cambridgeshire, England. It involved a Royal Air Force (RAF) aircraft flown by Sergeant Paulton, with Flight Sergeant Harold Jordan serving as the mission's radio frequency operator and Flight Sergeant William Bigoray serving as radio operator. Aside from Jordan, the aircrew were Canadian. Around 5am on 3 December 1942, the aircraft was attacked eleven times; around 7:20am, the aircraft reached the English coast. Jordan had been wounded in the attack, while Bigoray's legs were severely injured. The crew expected that Bigoray would not survive, and so he was parachuted out while the plane flew over Kent, with his technical documents tucked into his clothing in case he died. Bigoray landed safely and later recovered. The crew ditched the aircraft near Walmer at around 8:24am.

The Wireless Intelligence Development Unit became 109 Sqn on December 10, 1940, which looked for German radio sources. 192 Sqn flew all over Germany, from RAF Foulsham in north Norfolk, the first British squadron for conducting Ferret missions, with the 'Bagful' detector.

During D-Day, 192 Sqn flew constantly from Cherbourg to Calais, looking for German centimetric radar. Later in the war, 171 Sqn were at RAF North Creake, in north-west Norfolk. From August 1944 the 36th Bombardment Squadron flew B-24 aircraft out of RAF Cheddington in south Buckinghamshire, on Ferret missions.

192 Sqn became 51 Sqn in 1958, and carries out Ferret missions from RAF Waddington to this day.

=== United States ===
In October 1942, a Boeing B-17E of the 11th Bomb Group, with a XARD radar receiver, investigated the Solomon Islands, after the US had found Japanese radar equipment, during the Guadalcanal campaign. The equipment was developed at the Aircraft Radio Laboratory at Wilbur Wright Field in Ohio.

The United States' first ferret mission occurred on 6 March 1943, and involved a B-24 Liberator flying over Kiska, Alaska. Just over a month after that mission, the 16th Reconnaissance Squadron (now the 16th Electronic Warfare Squadron of the United States Air Force [USAF]) was formed at Foch Field in Tunisia.

One of first USAAF ferret aircraft was the B-25 'Beautiful Ohio' of 42nd Bomb Group, of the Radio and Radar Countermeasures Division in New Caledonia in 1944, in the South West Pacific Area (SWPA). At first, Japanese Radar units were around the Celebes Sea. The aircraft was operated by the Thirteenth Air Force. The B-24L 'Lady June II' had a AN/APR-4 and AN/APA-11 receiver., of 868th Bomb Squadron.

From January 1944 two Ferret B-24 aircraft with the 63rd Bomb Squadron were at Lae Nadzab Airport.

In the 1960s, almost 100 aircrew died, or became unaccounted for, flying ferret missions.

== Missile technology ==
In the 1991 Iraq War, missile technology made it possible to automate much of the work of searching for radar frequencies of enemy air defences. The resulting system, known as Suppression of Enemy Air Defenses (SEAD), was implemented by US forces with the AGM-88 HARM missile; and by British forces with the ALARM missile carried by the Panavia Tornado.

== Satellite technology ==
The Samos-F satellite, operated by the US National Reconnaissance Office in the 1960s, was known as a ferret satellite.

== Ferret missions by country ==
=== US ===
The USAF operated its early ferret missions out of Forbes Air Force Base in Kansas (now called Topeka Regional Airport). European ferret missions were carried out by the 7499th Support Group in Germany, and out of Yokota Air Base in Japan.

The 4200th Strategic Reconnaissance Wing was formed in January 1965, and its main aircraft, the Lockheed SR-71 Blackbird, first flew out of Beale Air Force Base in northern California in January 1966. This aircraft could fly at 90,000 ft (27,432 m) and at over 2,000 mph (3,219 km/h).

US ferret missions later moved to the 45th Reconnaissance Squadron of the 55th Wing, out of Offutt Air Force Base (south of Omaha, Nebraska).

Staff on such missions are commonly electronic warfare officers.

=== UK ===
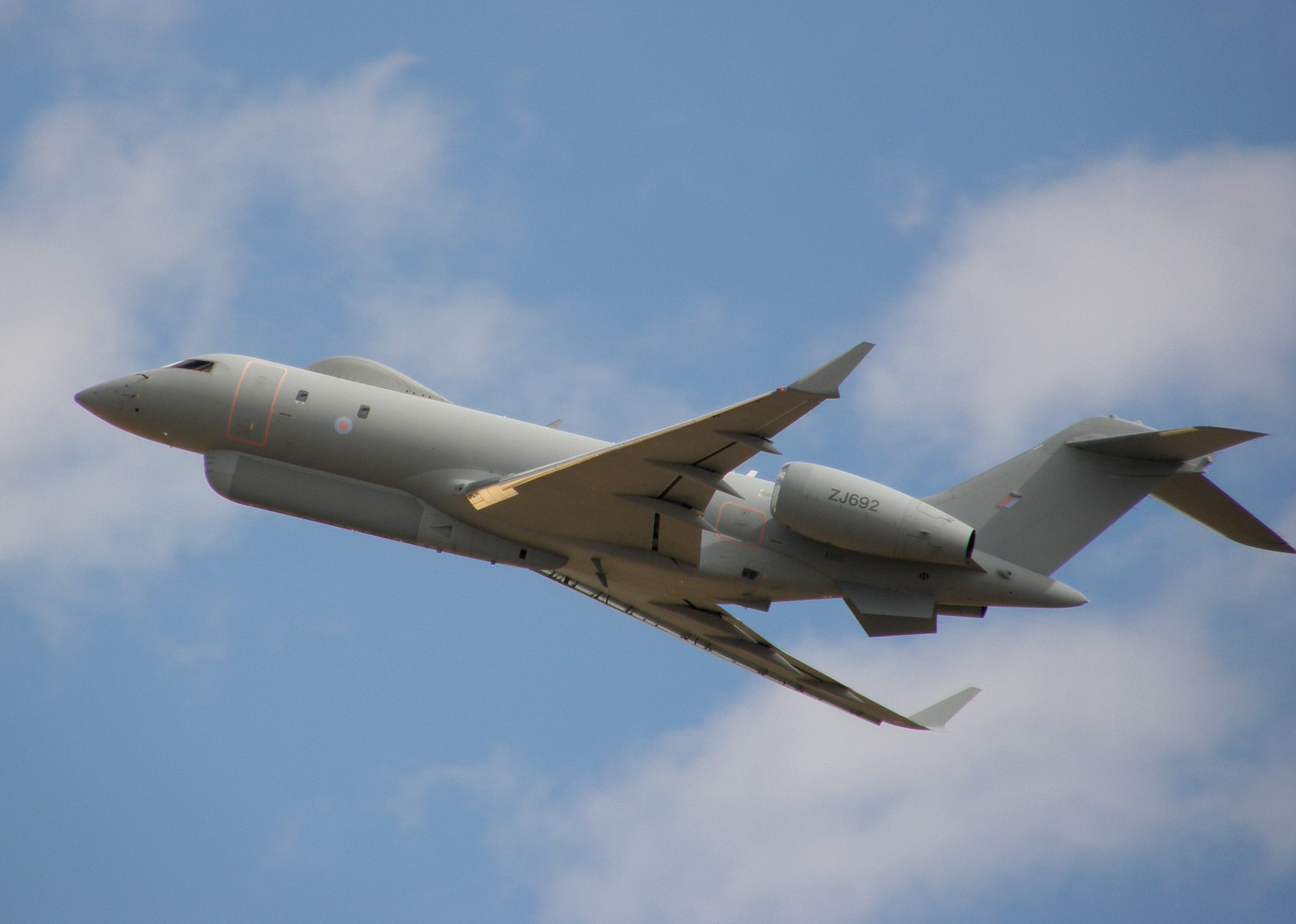
The RAF surveillance aircraft Raytheon Sentinel in October 2007

In the 1960s and early 1970s, the RAF flew ferret missions with 543 Squadron out of RAF Wyton in Cambridgeshire. These missions flew on Handley Page Victor aircraft. RAF Wyton is the home of the RAF's reconnaissance operations. 51 Squadron moved to Wyton in 1963, flying ferret missions over the Barents Sea. This squadron flew the Comet until 1974, when it changed to the Hawker Siddeley Nimrod. The RAF flew ferret missions with the Nimrod until 2011.

RAF Sculthorpe operated ferret missions for the USAF in the 1950s with the 322nd, 323nd, and the 324th reconnaissance squadrons, as well as the 91st Strategic Reconnaissance Wing.

Project HOMERUN ferret missions took off from England in April 1954.

The USAF 95th Reconnaissance Squadron operates regularly out of Suffolk.

=== Soviet Union ===
The Soviet Union probed air defence radar with their Long-Range Aviation Myasishchev M-4 (Bison) and Tupolev Tu-95 (Bear) aircraft.

The Soviets made unauthorised incursions with Aeroflot aircraft by turning off their transponders. On 9 November 1981, an Aeroflot Ilyushin Il-62 made an unannounced descent from 35,000 ft to 11,000 ft and switched off its transponder in order to fly directly over RAF Boulmer; it then climbed to 37,000 ft. The same Aeroflot aircraft had previously flown over a US military base at Groton, Connecticut, to investigate the Trident missile system.

== Shoot-down incidents ==
- 8 April 1950, a Consolidated PB4Y-2 Privateer commanded by Lt John Fette, flying from West Germany, was intercepted by four Soviet Lavochkin La-11 fighters near Liepāja in Soviet Latvia; ten US aircrew were killed.
- June 1952, RB-29 'Southern Comfort' of 91st Sqn searching Sakhalin and Kurile Islands, shot down over Mys-Chyorny
- 7 October 1952, RB-29 by two La-11 aircraft near Kurile Islands
- 12 March 1953, Avro Lincoln 'RF531' of 192 Sqn over Boizenburg downed by a MiG-15, with 6 out of 7 killed
- 2 September 1958, Lockheed RC-130 Hercules from Incirlik Air Base in Turkey, over the Armenian Soviet Socialist Republic 1958 C-130 shootdown incident, 17 killed by four MiG-17 aircraft
- 1 July 1960, Boeing B-47 Stratojet from an RAF base over the Barents Sea, the 1960 RB-47 shootdown incident, with 4 out of 6 died, shot down by Vasily Polyakov in a MiG-19

== See also ==
- Ferret Force
- List of United States Air Force reconnaissance aircraft
- List of B-47 units of the United States Air Force
- The multi-service tactical brevity code of NATO, includes Ferret
