= Martin and Mitchell defection =

1960 defection of two U.S. National Security Agency cryptologists to the Soviet Union

In September 1960, two U.S. National Security Agency (NSA) cryptologists, William Hamilton Martin and Bernon F. Mitchell, defected to the Soviet Union. A secret 1963 NSA study said that: "Beyond any doubt, no other event has had, or is likely to have in the future, a greater impact on the Agency's security program."

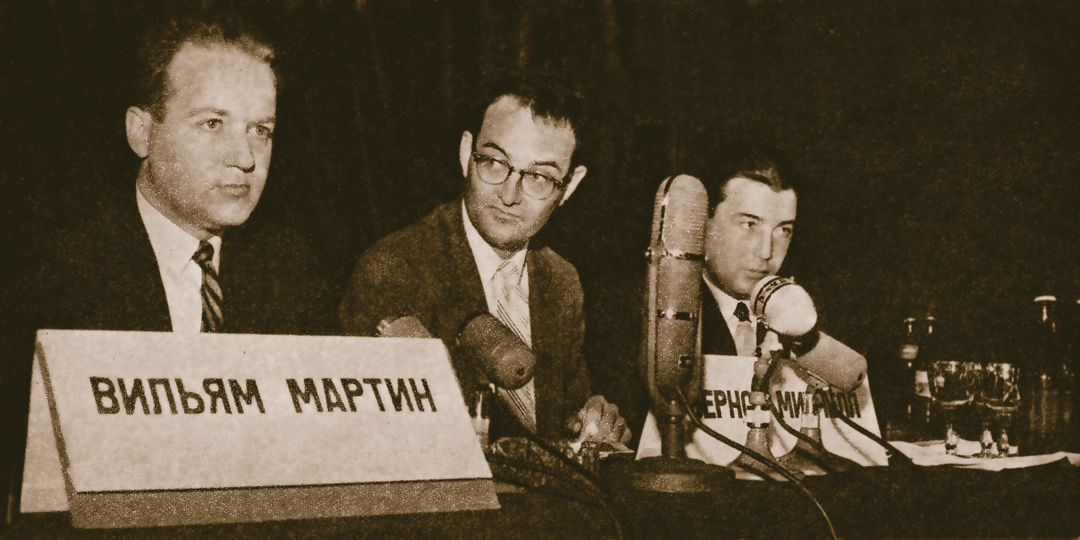
Martin and Mitchell in Moscow, 1960

Martin and Mitchell met while serving in the U.S. Navy in Japan in the early 1950s and both joined the NSA on the same day in 1957. They defected together to the Soviet Union in 1960 and, at a Moscow press conference, revealed and denounced various U.S. policies, especially provocative incursions into the air space of other nations and spying on America's own allies. Underscoring their apprehension of nuclear war, they said: "we would attempt to crawl to the moon if we thought it would lessen the threat of an atomic war."

Within days of the press conference, citing a trusted source, Congressman Francis E. Walter, chairman of the House Un-American Activities Committee (HUAC), said Martin and Mitchell were "sex deviates", prompting sensational press coverage. U.S. officials at the National Security Council privately shared their assumption that the two were part of a traitorous homosexual network. Classified NSA investigations, on the other hand, determined the pair had "greatly inflated opinions concerning their intellectual attainments and talents" and had defected to satisfy social aspirations. The House Un-American Activities Committee publicly intimated its interpretation of the relationship between Martin and Mitchell as homosexual and that reading guided the Pentagon's discussion of the defection for decades.

== Early lives and careers ==
William Hamilton Martin (May 27, 1931 – January 17, 1987) was born in Columbus, Georgia. His family soon moved to Washington state where his father was president of the Ellensburg Chamber of Commerce. He graduated from Ellensburg High School after two years. After studies at Central Washington College of Education (now Central Washington University), he earned a degree in mathematics from the University of Washington in Seattle in 1947. He enlisted in the United States Navy and served from 1951 to 1954, working as a cryptologist with the Naval Security Group in Japan. As hobbies, Martin played chess and collected Japanese sword handles (tsuka).

Bernon F. Mitchell (March 11, 1929 – November 12, 2001) was born and raised in Eureka, California, and enlisted in the US Navy after one year of college. He gained experience as a cryptologist during a tour of duty in the Navy from 1951 to 1954, serving in Japan with the Naval Security Group at Kami Seya. He stayed on in Japan for another year, working for the Army Security Agency. Following his Navy service, in 1957 he earned a bachelor's degree in statistics at Stanford University.

Martin and Mitchell became friends during their Navy service at the Naval communications intercept facility at Kami Seya, Japan. They kept in touch as each returned to school after their Navy service and encountered one another again when each was recruited into the National Security Agency (NSA) in 1957.

Their years at the NSA were uneventful. Martin gained enough recognition that he was twice awarded scholarships for study toward a master's degree.

== Background to defection ==
Mitchell and Martin became disturbed by what they learned of American incursions into foreign airspace and realized that Congress was unaware of those NSA-sponsored flights. In February 1959, in violation of NSA rules, they tried to report what they knew to a Congressman, Ohio Democrat Wayne Hays, who had expressed frustration with the information he was receiving from the NSA. (Note: Wayne G. Barker and Rodney E. Coffman, The Anatomy of Two Traitors: The Defection of Bernon F. Mitchell and William H. Martin, includes appendices that provide the full text of: "Predeparture Declaration Left in a Safe Deposit Box in the U.S.", "Statement Made at Press Conference in Moscow on September 6, 1960", and "Report by the Committee on Un-American Activities, House of Representatives, 87th Congress, 2nd Session, 'Security Practices in the National Security Agency'".) In December 1959, the pair visited Cuba, without notifying their superiors as required by NSA procedures. According to Galina Mitchell, Bernon Mitchell's widow, Bernon Mitchell and William Martin were not communists; they chose the Soviet Union for two reasons: there women could work equally with men, and because the USSR had a developed chess culture.

== Defection ==
On June 25, 1960, Mitchell and Martin flew on Eastern Airlines flight 307 from Washington to Mexico City. They flew from there to Havana and then sailed on a Russian freighter to the Soviet Union. On August 5, the Pentagon announced that they had not returned from vacation and said: "there is a likelihood that they have gone behind the Iron Curtain." On September 6, 1960, they appeared at a joint news conference at the House of Journalists in Moscow and announced they had requested asylum and Soviet citizenship.

During the conference, the defectors made public for the first time the mission and activities of the NSA in a prepared statement written, they said: "without consulting the Government of the Soviet Union". It said that: "the United States Government is as unscrupulous as it has accused the Soviet Government of being". They also said:

Our main dissatisfaction concerned some of the practices the United States uses in gathering intelligence information ... deliberately violating the airspace of other nations ... intercepting and deciphering the secret communications of its own allies ...

Perhaps United States hostility towards Communism arises out of a feeling of insecurity engendered by Communist achievements in science, culture and industry.

As we know from our previous experience working at N.S.A., the United States successfully reads the secure communications of more than forty nations, including its own allies.

They particularly attacked the views of General Thomas S. Power who had recently told a Congressional committee that the U.S. needed to maintain a nuclear first-strike capability and Senator Barry Goldwater's opposition to banning nuclear tests and negotiating a disarmament treaty. By contrast, they said: "we would attempt to crawl to the moon if we thought it would lessen the threat of an atomic war." The U.S. had recently admitted sending reconnaissance flights over foreign countries in recent years, but Martin and Mitchell said they knew from their Navy service that such flights had occurred as early as 1952–1954. They detailed a U.S. C-130 flight over Soviet Armenia that the Soviets brought down. They contended that it was designed to gain an understanding of Soviet defenses, and that it therefore represented an American interest in attacking the Soviets rather than defending against them. They also complained of restrictions on freedom in the U.S., such as government confiscation of mail, particularly the freedom of those who are "not theists" or "whose political convictions are unpopular". In an interview with the Soviet news agency TASS in December 1960, they expressed their belief that American espionage against Russia, U.S. allies, and neutral nations would continue unchanged despite the inauguration of a new American president in January 1961.

In response, the American government called Mitchell and Martin's charges "completely false". The Department of Defense called them "turncoats" and "tools of Soviet propaganda", "one mentally sick and both obviously confused". It also characterized their positions at the NSA as "junior mathematicians".

=== Initial allegations of homosexuality ===
The New York Times described them as "long-time bachelor friends" and reported they smiled at each other only when they described the social advantages they anticipated in the Soviet Union, where, their prepared statement said: "The talents of women are encouraged and utilized to a much greater extent in the Soviet Union than in the United States. We feel that this enriches Soviet society and makes Soviet women more desirable as mates."

The issue of the pair's sexuality was raised and dismissed by the government: "Representative Francis E. Walter, Democrat of Pennsylvania [and chairman of the House Un-American Activities Committee], denied that he had made an allegation, reported by a news agency, that one of the men had been described as a homosexual in a report by the Federal Bureau of Investigation." A Pentagon spokesman told reporters that there was nothing in Mitchell and Martin's personnel records to suggest homosexuality or sexual perversion. The next day, Congressman Walter explicitly stated that a source he trusted had told him that the two defectors were "known to their acquaintances as 'sex deviates'". That charge was promptly picked up by the press and resulted immediately in stories about homosexuals recruiting "other sexual deviates" for jobs in the federal government. Hearst newspapers referred to Martin and Mitchell as "two defecting blackmailed homosexual specialists" and a "love team". Time reported that a review of security checks turned up a Mitchell visit to a psychiatrist "presumably out of concern for homosexual tendencies".

== Later years ==
According to a later government report, Martin—who was fluent in Russian—studied at Leningrad University (now Saint Petersburg State University), and used the name Vladimir Sokolodsky. He married a Soviet citizen whom he divorced in 1963. He later told a Russian newspaper that his defection had been "foolhardy". He also expressed disappointment that the Russians did not trust him with important work. He occasionally sought the help of American visitors in arranging for repatriation, including Donald Duffy, vice president of the Kaiser Foundation, and bandleader Benny Goodman. On another occasion he told an American that before defecting he had believed the vision of Russia presented by propaganda publications like USSR and Soviet Life. By 1975, a source told the U.S. government Martin was "totally on the skids." In 1979, he inquired at the American consulate about repatriation. As a result, his case was examined and he was stripped of his American citizenship. He was next denied permission to immigrate to the U.S. and then denied a tourist visa. Martin eventually left the Soviet Union and died of cancer in Mexico on January 17, 1987, at Tijuana's Hospital Del Mar. He was buried in the U.S. (Note: According to Galina Mitchell, Bernon Mitchell's wife, Martin after divorcing "lived fast", lead a promiscuous sex life with female partners and was not a homosexual. She considered him mentally unstable. Her autobiography covers her life with Bernon, Music, Bernon – My Life (Музыка, Бернон – моя жизнь).)

Less is known of Mitchell. Having renounced his U.S. citizenship, he remained in the Soviet Union. He married Galina Vladimirovna Yakovleva, a member of the piano department faculty at the Leningrad Conservatory. He worked at the Bonch-Bruevich Institute in Leningrad as a programmer. In 1979, Bernon Mitchell tried to emigrate to the United States with his wife. After this became known, Galina was expelled from the ranks of the Communist Party of the Soviet Union. After reviewing the documents, Bernon Mitchell was denied entry into the United States. The visa was issued only to Galina, who refused to emigrate without her husband. Mitchell died of a heart attack in November 2001, and was buried in Saint Petersburg.

== Government response ==
The defections had another life inside the U.S. intelligence community. At a meeting of the National Security Council in October 1960, officials considered a response to the Martin-Mitchell affair. Attorney General William P. Rogers believed that the Soviets had a list of homosexuals to use in their recruiting and blackmail efforts, that Martin and Mitchell were part of "an organized group". Several at the meeting thought polygraph tests would help prevent the hiring of homosexuals. President Eisenhower himself wanted a central authority to coordinate all government lists of homosexuals.

In order to prevent another occurrence, the NSA needed to understand what motivated the defectors. Their initial investigation turned up little of interest. Notes of psychological counseling sessions from the 1940s described Martin as "brilliant but emotionally immature" and offered a diagnosis of "beginning character neurosis with schizoid tendencies" and mentioned he was likely "sadistic". Mitchell had told the NSA when questioned not long after starting work at the Agency that he had experimented sexually as a teenager with dogs and chickens. The immediate NSA response focused on sexual issues. In July 1961 the Agency announced that it had purged 26 employees it identified as "sexual deviates" though it added the qualification that "not all were homosexuals".

Yet a series of NSA investigations gave little credit to the role of sexuality in Mitchell and Martin's defection. In 1961, an NSA report called them "close friends and somewhat anti-social", "egotistical, arrogant and insecure young men whose place in society was much lower than they believed they deserved", with "greatly inflated opinions concerning their intellectual attainments and talents". In 1963, another NSA report found "no clear motive", that they had not been recruited by foreigners, and termed the defection "impulsive". (Note: Louis W. Tordella, NSA Deputy Director from 1958 to 1974, long worried that there was a mole at NSA, never identified, who had helped Martin and Mitchell. He believed that they were incapable without assistance of writing and typing the statement they left behind in the U.S. in a bank safe deposit box.) NSA files obtained by journalists at the Seattle Weekly in 2007 cited definitive testimony on the part of women acquaintances who attested to their heterosexuality. The only perversions recorded were Martin's "all-controlling sadomasochism". He had occasionally watched women having sex or had sex himself with multiple female partners.

In 1962, Congressman Walters' House Un-American Activities Committee (HUAC) concluded its 13-month investigation and issued a report on the defections. Where Mitchell had told his psychiatrist that he had affairs with both men and women and was not troubled about his sexual identity, the report referred to his "homosexual problems". The report never identified a rationale for the Mitchell and Martin defections, but focused on the inadequacy of the investigations that granted them security clearances despite evidence of "homosexuality or other sexual abnormality", atheism, and Communist sympathies on the part of one or both of the men. The report made a series of recommendations with respect to NSA hiring practices and security investigations that were promptly adopted by the Agency.

Later government analyses went beyond the characterizations in the HUAC account, unaware of the NSA's unpublished analysis. Despite the contrary evidence, a 1991 study by the Pentagon's Defense Security Service—still in use in 2007—called Martin and Mitchell "publicly known homosexuals".

== See also ==
- Project HOMERUN
- Lavender scare
- Perry Fellwock

== Additional sources ==
- Barrett, David M. (2009). "Secrecy, Security, and Sex: The NSA, Congress, and the Martin–Mitchell Defections". International Journal of Intelligence and CounterIntelligence. 22 (4): 699–729. doi:10.1080/08850600903143320. S2CID 154112700.
- Obituary, Eureka Times-Standard, November 2001
