= Air-to-air combat losses between the Soviet Union and the United States =

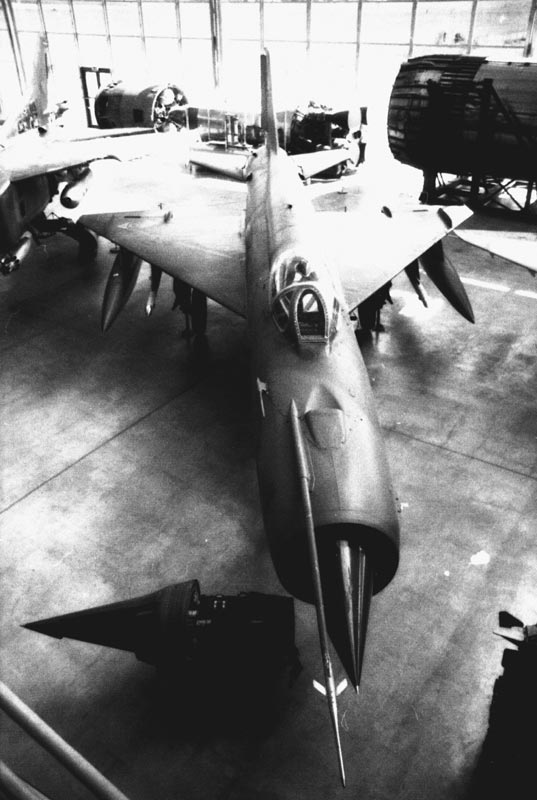
A Soviet Mikoyan-Gurevich MiG-21

After World War II, there were many instances of air-to-air combat between the Soviet Union and the United States.

== Korean War ==
During the Korean War formally the air forces did not meet, as the Soviet Union was not a combatant in the conflict. In August 1945 the USSR declared war on Japan and commenced their offensive campaigns against the Japanese Army. Moving into Japanese occupied Korea, the Soviets gained a foothold in that region, ultimately making it North Korea, and an ally to the Soviet Union. Nearly 72,000 Soviet personnel served in North Korea and their presence was concealed by both the Soviet and American governments. Following the outbreak of the Korean War, air dogfights between USSR and US pilots were numerous. The Soviets flew planes with Chinese or North Korean markings, and were initially forbidden from speaking Russian over the airwaves. The ban was soon lifted due to obvious problems with using Korean to communicate in critical battle situations.

During the conflict the American F-86 Sabre pilots claimed to have destroyed 792 MiG-15s in air-to-air combat for a loss of 78 Sabres – a phenomenal 10 to 1 kills-to-losses ratio. The Soviets claimed to have downed over 600 Sabres. More recent research by Lake Dorr and Warren Thompson has claimed the actual ratio was closer to 2 : 1. A 2009 RAND review concluded that the actual kill : loss ratio was 1.8 : 1 overall, and likely closer to 1.3 : 1 against MiGs flown by Soviet pilots. However, this ratio does not include the number of aircraft of other types (B-29, A-26, F-80, F-82, F-84, etc) were shot down by MiG-15s.

== Vietnam War ==
Student North Vietnamese MiG pilots were sent to China and the Soviet Union for up to three years for training. Also student North Vietnamese SAM operators were sent to the USSR for about six to nine months of training. Soviet and Chinese Communist pilots were restricted to test flying MiGs which had been exported to North Vietnam from their countries. Due to the urgency brought on by Operation Rolling Thunder, and until North Vietnamese missilemen could be trained, Soviet PVO SAM Anti-Aircraft Missile operator/instructors were quickly deployed to North Vietnam in 1965, and through 1966 were reportedly responsible for downing approximately 48 US aircraft during the war. There is one reported ace pilot from the USSR, Col. Vadim Shcherbakov who is credited with 6 air-to-air kills.

== Cold War ==
During the Cold War many nations including the Soviet Union and the United States were fiercely protective of their airspaces. Aircraft which entered an opposing nation's airspace were often shot down in air-to-air combat. The incidents produced a heightened sense of paranoia on both sides that resulted in the downing of civilian craft. Many of the aircraft listed at that link were not shot down as a result of Cold War paranoia by US or USSR aircrews, but rather direct action by active combatants (for example, the two Air Rhodesia flights).

The table lists air combat losses outside of the war zones, such as Korean War or Vietnam War. It does not include losses to ground-based defenses, and it does not include civilian aircraft.

Date	Location	Plane shot down	Intercepting Aircraft	Interceptor	Reference
April 8, 1950	Baltic Sea	(United States) US Navy PB4Y-2 Privateer	La-11 "Fang"	(Soviet Union) Soviet Air Defence Forces	
September 4, 1950	Near Vladivostok	(Soviet Union) Soviet Naval Aviation A-20 bomber	F4U-4B Corsair	(United States) US Navy	
October-December 1950	Near Vladivostok	(Soviet Union) Soviet Air Defence Forces MiG-15	P2V-3 Neptune (Defensive guns)	(United States) US Navy	
November 6, 1951	Near Vladivostok	(United States) US Navy P2V-3 Neptune	La-11 "Fang"	(Soviet Union) Soviet Air Defence Forces	
June 13, 1952	Sea of Japan	(United States) US Air Force RB-29 Superfortress	MiG-15 "Fagot"	(Soviet Union) Soviet Air Defence Forces	
October 7, 1952	Over the Kurile Islands	(United States) US Air Force RB-29 Superfortress	La-11 "Fang"	(Soviet Union) Soviet Air Defence Forces	
November 18, 1952	Near Vladivostok	(Soviet Union) Soviet Air Defence Forces MiG-15	F9F-5 Panther	(United States) US Navy	
July 29, 1953	Sea of Japan	(United States) US Air Force RB-50G Superfortress	MiG-17 "Fresco"	(Soviet Union) Soviet Air Defence Forces	
September 4, 1954	Off the coast of Siberia	(United States) US Navy P2V-5	MiG-15 "Fagot"	(Soviet Union) Soviet Air Defence Forces	
November 7, 1954	Near the coast of Hokkaido, Japan	(United States) US Air Force RB-29 Superfortress	MiG-15 "Fagot"	(Soviet Union) Soviet Air Defence Forces	
April 17, 1955	Near the coast of Hokkaido, Japan	(United States) US Air Force RB-47E	MiG-15 "Fagot"	(Soviet Union) Soviet Air Defence Forces	
June 22, 1955	Near the St. Lawrence Island, Bering Sea	(United States) US Navy P2V-5 Neptune	MiG-15 "Fagot"	(Soviet Union) Soviet Air Defence Forces	
June 27, 1958	Armenia, USSR	(United States) US Air Force C-118	MiG-17P "Fresco"	(Soviet Union) Soviet Air Defence Forces	
September 2, 1958	Armenia, USSR	(United States) US Air Force C-130A	MiG-17 "Fresco"	(Soviet Union) Soviet Air Defence Forces	
July 1, 1960	Near the Kola Peninsula, USSR	(United States) US Air Force RB-47H	MiG-19 "Farmer"	(Soviet Union) Soviet Air Defence Forces	
January 28, 1964	Erfurt, East Germany	(United States) US Air Force T-39 Sabreliner	MiG-19 "Farmer"	(Soviet Union) Soviet Air Force	
March 10, 1964	Gardelegen, East Germany	(United States) US Air Force RB-66 Destroyer	MiG-21 "Fishbed"	(Soviet Union) Soviet Air Force	
October 21, 1970	Armenia, USSR	United States Army RU-8 Seminole	MiG-17 "Fresco"	(Soviet Union) Soviet Air Defence Forces	

== See also ==
- Post–World War II air-to-air combat losses
- 1958 C-130 shootdown incident
- 1960 RB-47 shootdown incident
- 1964 T-39 shootdown incident
