= Post–World War II air-to-air combat losses =

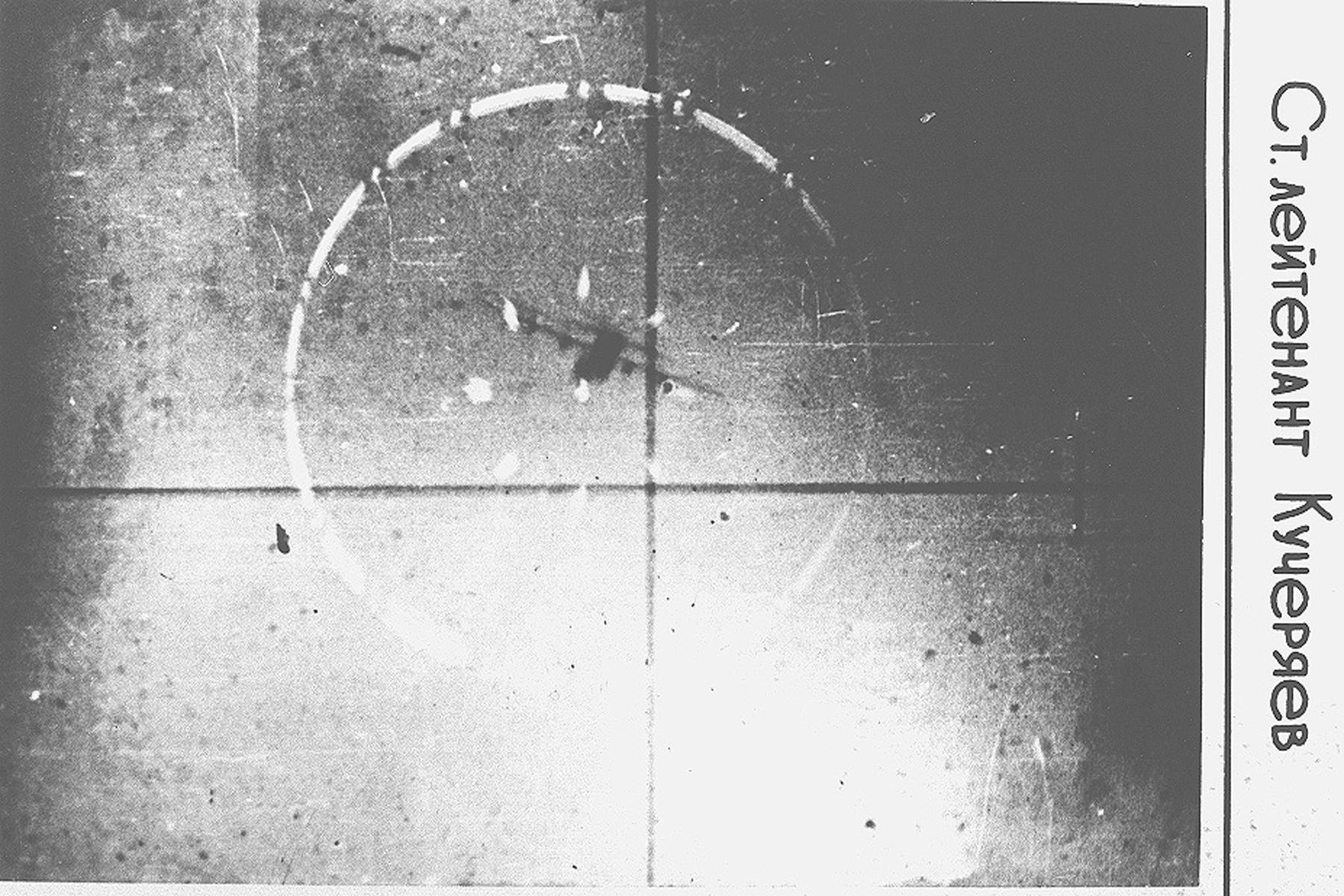
The last moments of a U.S. Air Force recon C-130 Hercules in gun camera of the Soviet MiG-17 (2 September 1958)

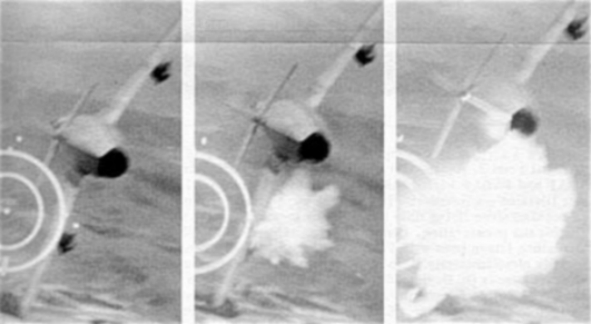
Gun camera sequence photos showing a North Vietnamese MiG-17 being hit and shot down by 20 mm shells from a U.S. Air Force F-105D Thunderchief during the Vietnam War (3 June 1967)

Air-to-air combat is the engagement of combat aircraft in warfare in which primarily fixed-wing aircraft attempt to destroy enemy aircraft using guns, rockets and missiles.

== Background ==
The Korean War saw the greatest amount of air-to-air combat since World War II. During the war the United States claimed to have shot down around 700 fighters. (Note: During the Korean War experienced Soviet pilots flew against USAF forces.) By the end of the war, US F-86 Sabre pilots were initially credited by American sources with having shot down 792 MiGs for a loss of only 78 Sabres in air-to-air combat, a victory ratio of 10:1. After the war the U.S. Air Force reviewed its figures in an investigation code-named Sabre Measure Charlie and downgraded the kill ratio of the F-86 Sabre against the Mikoyan-Gurevich MiG-15 by half to a 5:1 ratio.

The research by Dorr, Lake and Thompson claimed an F-86 kill ratio closer to 2:1. A recent RAND report made reference to "recent scholarship" of F-86 v MiG-15 combat over Korea and concluded that the actual kill:loss ratio for the F-86 was 1.8:1 overall, and likely closer to 1.3:1 against MiGs flown by Soviet pilots. However, this ratio did not count the number of aircraft of other types (including the B-29, A-26, F-80, F-82, F-84 and Gloster Meteor) shot down by MiG-15 pilots.

One of the factors inflating US numbers was that most dogfights took place over enemy-controlled area. The only way to confirm kills was through gun camera photography. USAF pilots were credited with a kill if the gun camera showed their guns striking the enemy aircraft even if no one actually saw it go down. Soviet Air Force kill claims were also exaggerated, based upon inherent flaws in their film grading procedures. For instance, the S-13 gun camera was not aligned with either the gunsight or either cannons' ballistics. It ran only while the firing buttons were depressed. Film graders commonly included unit commanders and political commissars who would confirm a "kill"—sometimes even if one had not been claimed by a pilot—when the camera's crosshairs touched the target for two movie frames. During the first 16 months of combat Soviet V-VS units claimed 218 F-86s destroyed when only 36 (35 to the two elite IADs and one to the 50th IAD) had been lost. This results in a 600 per cent inflation rate in victory credits over actual Sabres destroyed. However, these figures are complicated by the fact that the Americans routinely attributed combat losses to landing accidents and other causes.

The Vietnam War saw a move away from cannon fire to air-to-air missiles. Although US forces maintained air supremacy throughout the war, there were still occasional dogfights and US and North Vietnamese aces. The North Vietnamese side claimed the Vietnam People's Air Force had 17 aces throughout the war, including Nguyễn Văn Cốc, who is also the top ace of Vietnam War with nine kills: seven acknowledged by the United States Air Force.

During the 1947 conflict over Jammu and Kashmir, the Indian Air Force did not engage the Pakistan Air Force in air-to-air combat; however, it did provide effective transport and close air support to the Indian Army troops.

On 10 April 1959, an Indian English Electric Canberra was shot down while performing a Reconnaissance mission over Rawalpindi. The Canberra was shot down by a Pakistani F-86 Sabre flown by Flight Lieutenant M Younis of the No. 15 Squadron. The two crew members of the Canberra ejected and were later arrested by Pakistani authorities, this incident also marked the first aerial victory of the Pakistan Air Force.

The Indo-Pakistani War of 1965 was the first time the Indian Air Force actively engaged an enemy air force. By the time the conflict had ended, India had lost 22 aircraft by enemy aircraft fire, while Pakistan lost 9 aircraft. In total India lost 65-70 aircraft by all causes while Pakistan 20.

During the Indo-Pakistani war of 1971, both Air Forces clashed for the second time, in this conflict the Indian Air Force lost 20 aircraft in air-to-air combat, in turn Pakistan Air Force lost 16. In total India lost 45 to 65 aircraft by all causes and Pakistan 42.

During the Iran–Iraq War of 1980–88, there were nearly 1,000 air-to-air engagements between Iran and Iraq, including the only known instances of helicopters dogfighting and shooting down other helicopters. The Falklands War of 1982 witnessed air combat between Argentine and British military aircraft. The Falkland Islands' runways were short and thus unable to support fighter jets, forcing Argentina to launch fighters from the mainland, which had an adverse effect on their loiter time. The Argentine forces lost 23 aircraft in air-to-air combat, out of a total of 134 fixed wing aircraft and helicopters lost during the conflict.

During the Persian Gulf War; the Iraqi Armed Forces lost 23 aircraft from their inventory of 750 fixed-wing aircraft, compared to 3 coalition aircraft downed.

== Aircraft lost to air-to-air combat ==
| Conflict | Losing Air Force | Aircraft lost to air-to-air combat | Reference |
|---|---|---|---|
| US incursions into Yugoslav airspace (1946) | (United States) USAAF | 2 (Note: Two US C-47s shoot down by Yugoslavian Yak-3 over Northern Yugoslavia.) | |
| Indonesian National Revolution | (British Raj) Royal Indian Air Force | 2 | |
| Arab–Israeli War (1948–1949) | Royal Air Force | 5 | |
| Arab–Israeli War (1948–1949) | Israeli Air Force | 7 (Western claim); 0-1 (Israeli claim) | |
| Arab–Israeli War (1948–1949) | Royal Egyptian Air Force | 15 | |
| Arab–Israeli War (1948–1949) | Syrian Air Force | 2 | |
| Korean War (1950–1953) (Note: First combat instance of a jet shooting down a jet happened during this war.) | PLAAF (North Korea) North Korean Air Force (Soviet Union) Soviet Air Defence Forces | 659 MiG-15 lost by all causes (USSR:335, PLAAF:224 and North Korea:100); 796 aircraft of all types shot down by UN aircraft (UN claims) | |
| Korean War (1950–1953) | (United States) US aircraft | 2,714 aircraft lost by all causes 1,106 aircraft (USSR claimed kills by MiG-15), 85 (PRC claimed kills); 147 aircraft lost by enemy aircraft (US claim) | |
| Korean War (1950–1953) | (United Nations) UN Coalition aircraft | 197 (Soviet claim), 139 (UN claim) (Note: Soviet claim of planes shot down) | |
| Korean War (1950–1953) | South Korean Air Force | 135 | |
| US and Soviet shootdown incidents (1950–1970) | (United States) US aircraft | 16 | (Note: See the US Soviet air-to-air combat article) |
| US and Soviet shootdown incidents (1950–1970) | (Soviet Union) Soviet Air Defence Forces | 3 | (Note: See the Air-to-air combat losses between the USSR and US article) |
| Catalina affair | (Sweden) Swedish Air Force | 2 | |
| 1953 Avro Lincoln shootdown incident | Royal Air Force | 1 | |
| Air battle over Merklín | (United States) USAFE | 1 (Note: US F-84E shot down by Czech Mig-15 over Merlín.) | |
| Bombing of Plaza de Mayo (1955) | (Argentina) Argentine Naval Aviation | 1 | |
| Suez Crisis (1956) | Egypt Air Force | 7–9 | |
| Suez Crisis (1956) | Israeli Air Force | 1 | |
| Suez Crisis (1956) | Royal Air Force | 1 (Note: RAF Canberra reconnaissance aircraft shot down by Syrian fighter jet near Homs.) | |
| Secret electronic surveillance missions | United States Navy | 2 (Note: On 22 August 1956, a USN Martin P4M Mercator of VQ-1 was shot down by 'hostile aircraft' in the Taiwan Strait, with the loss of all 16 crew.; On 14 April 1969, a USN Lockheed EC-121 Warning Star of VQ-1 was shot down by a pair of Mikoyan-Gurevich MiG-21s of the Korean People's Army Air Force over the Sea of Japan with the loss of the entire crew, in the 1969 EC-121 shootdown incident.) | |
| Permesta Rebellion | CIA/AUREV | 1 | |
| Second Taiwan Strait Crisis (Note: First combat use of guided air-to-air missiles occurred during this war.) | PLAAF | 32 (ROC claim); 5 (PRC claim) | |
| Second Taiwan Strait Crisis | ROCAF | 14 (PRC claim); 3 (ROC claim) | |
| 1959 Canberra shootdown (Note: First aerial victory of the Pakistan Air Force) | Indian Air Force | 1 | |
| Vietnam War (1959–1975) (Note: First combat instance of a crewed aircraft shooting down a UAV happened during this war.) | Vietnam People's Air Force | 131 (North Vietnam claim); 195 (US claim) | |
| Vietnam War (1959–1975) | (United States) US aircraft | 128 (US Claim), 266 (North Vietnam claim) | |
| Vietnam War (1959–1975) | Republic of Vietnam Air Force | 72 | |
| Taiwanese incursion into Burma airspace | Republic of China Air Force | 1 | |
| First Iraqi–Kurdish War | (Iraq) Iraqi Air Force | 2 | |
| Dutch–Indonesian Conflict | Indonesian Air Force | 1 | |
| Project Dark Gene (1960–79) | Soviet Air Force | 1 | |
| Project Dark Gene (1960–79) | (Iran) Imperial Iranian Air Force | 6 | |
| Bay of Pigs Invasion | Brigade 2506 | 10 (Confirmed) | |
| Six-Day War (1967) | Israeli Air Force | 21 (Note: Shot down by enemy aircraft or crashed during dogfighting) | |
| Six-Day War (1967) | Egypt Air Force; Syrian Air Force; Royal Jordanian Air Force | 64–72 (Note: Numbers include unconfirmed losses) | |
| Indo-Pakistani air war of 1965 | Indian Air Force | 22 | |
| Indo-Pakistani air war of 1965 | Pakistan Air Force | 9 | |
| War of Attrition (1967-1970) | Egyptian Air Force (Soviet Union) Soviet Air Defence Forces | 60 (Egyptian claim);113 (Israeli claim) 4-5 (Soviet MiG-21MFs) | |
| War of Attrition (1967-1970) | Israeli Air Force | 4 (Israeli claim) | |
| Football War (Note: The last war in which piston-engined fighter planes fought each other.) | (El Salvador) Salvadoran Air Force | 3 | |
| Indo-Pakistani war of 1971 | Indian Air Force | 20 | |
| Indo-Pakistani war of 1971 | Pakistan Air Force | 16 | |
| Turkish invasion of Cyprus | (Turkey) Turkish Air Force | 1 (Greek claim) | |
| Yom Kippur War (1973) | Israeli Air Force | 7 | |
| Yom Kippur War (1973) | Egyptian Air Force; Syrian Air Force | 277 (Israeli claim) | |
| Egyptian–Libyan War (1977) | (Libya) Libyan Air Force | 4–5 | |
| Egyptian–Libyan War (1977) | Egypt Air Force | 1 | |
| Iranian and Soviet airspace incursions (1970s) | (Iran) Imperial Iranian Army Aviation + IIAF | 2 (Note: In 1978, a Soviet Mig-23 Flogger intercepted 4 Iranian CH-47 Chinook helicopters over Karakum Canal inside Soviet airspace, shooting one of them down and damaging another. The damaged helicopter managed to land inside the Soviet Union and its crew was captured by Soviet forces. Later, the crew was released and the helicopter was allowed to be repaired and return to Iran.) + 3 | |
| Iranian and Soviet airspace incursions (1970s) | Soviet Air Force | 1 | |
| Soviet–Afghan War | (Democratic Republic of Afghanistan) Afghan National Army Air Corps | 8 (Shot down by Pakistan); 4 Rebel fighters (Shot down by Soviets) | |
| Soviet–Afghan War | Pakistan Air Force | 1 (Friendly fire) | |
| Soviet–Afghan War | Islamic Republic of Iran Army Aviation | 2 (Note: In 1988, two Soviet Mig-23 Floggers shot down a pair of Iranian AH-1J SuperCobra attack helicopters over western Afghanistan.) | |
| Soviet–Afghan War | Mojahedin | 4 | |
| Nicaraguan Revolution | (Nicaragua) Nicaraguan Air Force | 2 | |
| Iran–Iraq War (1980–1988) | Iraqi aircraft | 234 (confirmed) | |
| Iran–Iraq War (1980–1988) | (Iran) Iranian aircraft | 73 (confirmed) | |
| Iran–Iraq War (1980–1988) | Soviet Air Force | 3 (Iranian claim); 0 (Soviet claim) | |
| Iran–Iraq War (1980–1988) | Syrian Air Force | 3 | |
| Iran–Iraq War (1980–1988) | (Algeria) Algerian Government aircraft | 1 | |
| Iran–Iraq War (1980–1988) | (Turkey) Turkish Air Force | 1 | |
| South African Border War | South African Air Force | 1 | |
| South African Border War | National Air Force of Angola | 2 | |
| US Freedom of Navigation operations near Libya (1980–1989) | (History of Libya under Muammar Gaddafi) Libyan Air Force | 4 | |
| Salvadoran Civil War | FMLN supply aircraft | 1 | |
| Falklands War | (Argentina) Argentine Naval Aviation/Argentine Air Force | 23 | |
| Falklands War | (United Kingdom) Army Air Corps | 1 | |
| 1982 Royal Air Force Jaguar shootdown incident | Royal Air Force | 1 | |
| 1982 Lebanon War | Syrian Air Force | 82–86 (Israeli claim) | |
| 1982 Lebanon War | Israeli Air Force | 1 (Israeli claim); 42 (Syrian claim); 3 (ACIG claim) | |
| Sri Lankan Civil War (1983–2009) | Liberation Tigers of Tamil Eelam | 1 | |
| Tanker War (1984–1988) | Islamic Republic of Iran Air Force | 1 (Iranian claim) 2 (Saudi claim) | |
| Persian Gulf War (1990–1991) | (United States) US aircraft | 4 (US claim); 12 (Iraqi claim) | |
| Persian Gulf War (1990–1991) | Royal Air Force | 1 (Iraqi claim) | |
| Persian Gulf War (1990–1991) | (Italy) Italian Air Force | 1 (Iraqi claim) | |
| Persian Gulf War (1990–1991) | (Saudi Arabia) Royal Saudi Air Force | 1 (Iraqi claim) | |
| Persian Gulf War (1990–1991) | (Iraq) Iraqi Air Force | 23 (Iraqi claim); 44 (Coalition claim) | |
| Iraqi no-fly zones enforcement | (United States) US aircraft | 3 (Note: The 1994 Black Hawk shootdown incident, sometimes referred to as the Black Hawk Incident, was a friendly fire incident over northern Iraq that occurred on April 14, 1994 during Operation Provide Comfort. The pilots of two United States Air Force (USAF) F-15 fighter aircraft, operating under the control of a USAF airborne warning and control system (AWACS) aircraft, misidentified two United States Army UH-60 Black Hawk helicopters as Iraqi Mil Mi-24 "Hind" helicopters. The F-15 pilots fired on and destroyed both helicopters, killing all 26 military service members and civilians from the United States, United Kingdom, France, Turkey, and the Kurdish community. The third loss was a Predator UAV shot down by a MiG-25 in December 2002.) | |
| Iraqi no-fly zones enforcement | (Iraq) Iraqi Air Force | 5 | |
| Croatian War of Independence (1991–1995) | (Italy) Italian Army | 1 (Note: An Italian Army Bell 206 helicopter was shot down by a Serb MiG over Novi Marof, near Varaždin, Croatia, on 7 January 1992. One French and four Italian military observers were killed. The incident prompted the resignation of the Yugoslav Minister of Defence. The helicopter was part of a European Community mission in Croatia.) | |
| 1992 Venezuelan coup d'état attempts | (Venezuela) Bolivarianos | 3 | |
| Operation Deny Flight | Republika Srpska Air Force | 5 | |
| Cenepa War (1995) | (Peru) Peruvian Air Force | 1 (confirmed), 2 (Ecuadorian claim) | |
| Aegean dispute (1996) | (Turkey) Turkish Air Force | 1 | |
| Eritrean–Ethiopian War (1998–2000) | (Eritrea) Eritrean Air Force | 2–6 | |
| Eritrean–Ethiopian War (1998–2000) | (Ethiopia) Ethiopian Air Force | Up to 7 | |
| NATO bombing of Yugoslavia | (Serbia and Montenegro) Yugoslav Air Force | 5 + 1 heavily damaged, later destroyed on the ground | |
| NATO bombing of Yugoslavia | NATO aircraft | 1 + 1 Tomahawk | |
| 1999 Pakistan Breguet 1150 Atlantic shootdown | Pakistan Navy | 1 | |
| 2001–2002 India–Pakistan standoff | Indian Air Force | 1 (Note: On the night of 8 June 2002, a pair of IAI Searcher II UAV of Indian Air Force were detected inside Pakistan by "mobile observation units". The Pakistan Air Force scrambled 2 Mirage III's and 4 F-7P fighter jets which failed to detect and intercept the drones. Finally a pair of F-16B's of the Pakistan Air Force succeeded to intercept and shoot down one of the drones using their AIM-9Ls.) | |
| 2008 Georgian drone shootdowns | Georgian Air Force | 1 | |
| Iraq War (2003–2011) | Islamic Republic of Iran Air Force | 1 (Note: According to U.S and Iraqi sources, in February 2009 a USAF F-16 intercepted and shot down an Iranian UAV that had violated Iraqi airspace.) | |
| War in Afghanistan (2001–2021) | United States Air Force | 1 (Note: According to U.S sources, on 13 September 2009, a USAF McDonnell Douglas F-15E Strike Eagle intercepted and shot down an armed, out-of-control USAF General Atomics MQ-9 Reaper UAV near the Afghanistan–Tajikistan border.) | |
| Syrian civil war | Syrian Air Force | 7 | |
| Syrian civil war | Russian Air Force | 2 | |
| Syrian civil war | Pro Assad government forces | 4 (Note: On June 8, 2017, an American F-15E shot down a Shahed-129 UCAV, which the US military said was attacking American-backed forces. The US military said the drone, which appeared to be made by Iran, was being operated by "pro-Syria regime" forces. A second pro-regime Shahed-129 was shot down by an American F-15E on June 19. A third UAS was shot down by an American F-15E on August 21, 2021, in eastern Syria. The type of UAS was not disclosed. On December 14, 2021, a fourth UAV was shot down by a Eurofighter Typhoon of the Royal Air Force over southern Syria. Neither the type of UAV nor the operator was disclosed, it being described simply as 'hostile'. The December 14 engagement also represented the first air-to-air shootdown of an enemy aircraft by the UK military since the Falklands War.) | |
| Syrian civil war | (Turkey) Turkish Air Force | 1 | |
| War in Donbass | Ukrainian Air Force | 1 | |
| Libyan civil war (2014–2020) | (Turkey) Turkish Air Force | 1 | |
| 2016 Turkish coup attempt | (Turkey) Peace at Home Council | 2 | |
| Insurgency in Balochistan | Iran | 1 | |
| 2019 India–Pakistan border skirmishes | Indian Air Force | 1 (confirmed), 2 (Pakistani claim) | |
| Second Nagorno-Karabakh War | (Armenia) Armenian Air Force | 1 | |
| Russian invasion of Ukraine | Ukrainian Air Force | 15 (as of 2 February 2025) | |
| Russian invasion of Ukraine | (Ukraine) Ukrainian Army Aviation | 2 | |
| Russian invasion of Ukraine | Ukrainian Naval Aviation | 1 | |
| Russian invasion of Ukraine | United States Air Force | 1 (MQ-9 Reaper UAV) | |
| 2025 India–Pakistan conflict | Indian Air Force | 3 (Neutral claim), 8 (Pakistani claim) | |
| 2026 Iran war | United States Air Force | 3 (Friendly fire by Kuwait) | |
| 2026 Iran war | Islamic Republic of Iran Air Force | 3 | |

== See also ==
- Project Dark Gene
- Air-to-air combat losses between the Soviet Union and the United States
- List of airliner shootdown incidents
