= Donald E. Hillman =

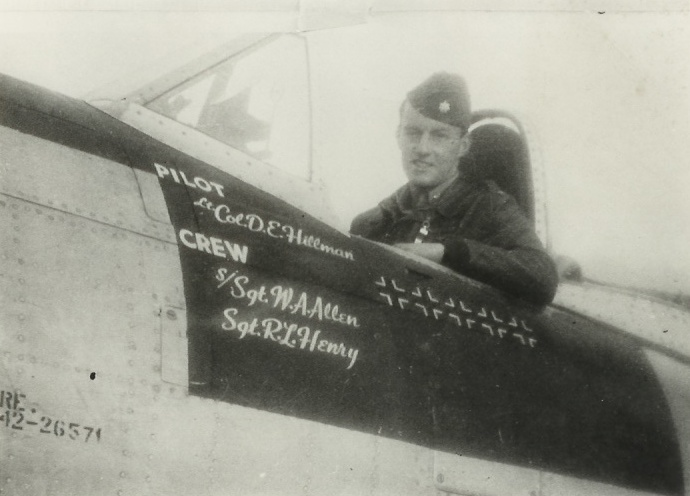
- Lt. Col. Hillman in his P-47
- Born: August 24, 1918; Seattle, Washington, U.S.
- Died: March 16, 2012 (aged 93); Seattle, Washington, U.S.
- Military career
- Allegiance: United States
- Branch: United States Army Air Corps; United States Army Air Forces; United States Air Force
- Service years: 1940–1962
- Rank: Colonel
- Units: 365th Fighter Group; 1st Fighter Wing; 306th Bombardment Wing
- Commands: 386th Fighter Squadron; 388th Fighter Squadron; 94th Fighter Squadron; 6th Air Mobility Wing
- Conflicts: World War II
- Awards: Silver Star (2); Legion of Merit; Distinguished Flying Cross (4); Purple Heart (2); Air Medal (34); Army Commendation Medal (2); Croix de guerre (France)
- Other work: Air Force liaison for Boeing

Donald Edison Hillman (August 24, 1918 – March 16, 2012) was an American World War II flying ace and prisoner of war credited with five enemy aircraft destroyed. He was also the first American pilot, in 1952, to make a deep-penetration overflight of Soviet territory for the purpose of aerial reconnaissance.

== Early life ==
Hillman was born in Seattle, Washington on August 24, 1918. He graduated from Broadway High School, and attended the University of Washington for a short time before transferring to Virginia Military Academy. He then transferred to Stanford University, where he graduated with a business degree in 1939.

== Military career ==
Hillman joined up in October 1940, and underwent his flight training with the Army Air Corps. In 1943, he deployed to Europe as commander of the 386th Fighter Squadron. He flew P-47 escort missions initially with the Eighth Air Force, and then in 1944 with the Ninth Air Force. Later that year he was shot down and held as a prisoner of war in Stalag Luft III. After an unsuccessful escape attempt, he was transferred to another camp, where he managed to successfully escape, aided and accompanied by a disillusioned German officer. After the war the two became good friends.

On October 15, 1952, a Boeing B-47B Stratojet piloted by then Colonel Hillman, deputy commander of the 306th Bombardment Wing, left Eielson Air Force Base in Alaska. It crossed over the Arctic Ocean, turned eastwards back over Siberia, and returned to Eielson via Provideniya. It was the United States' first deep-penetration reconnaissance mission against the Soviet Union.

Hillman retired from the Air Force in 1962, taking up an Air Force liaison position with Boeing in Seattle. He died on March 16, 2012, aged 93.
