= Nerkin Sasnashen =

Nerkin Sasnashen Ներքին Սասնաշեն
- Location within Armenia Location within Aragatsotn
- Coordinates: 40°21′43″N 43°58′58″E
- Country: Armenia
- Province: Aragatsotn
- Municipality: Talin

Population (2011)
  - Total: 904
- Time zone: UTC+4
  - Summer (DST): UTC+5

Nerkin Sasnashen (Armenian: Ներքին Սասնաշեն) is a village in the Talin Municipality of the Aragatsotn Province of Armenia. It is home to the ruins of a 7th-century Armenian monastery. The village contains a granite memorial marking the crash site of a United States Air Force C-130 shot down by Soviet MiG-17s on 2 September 1958 with the loss of 17 U.S. personnel.

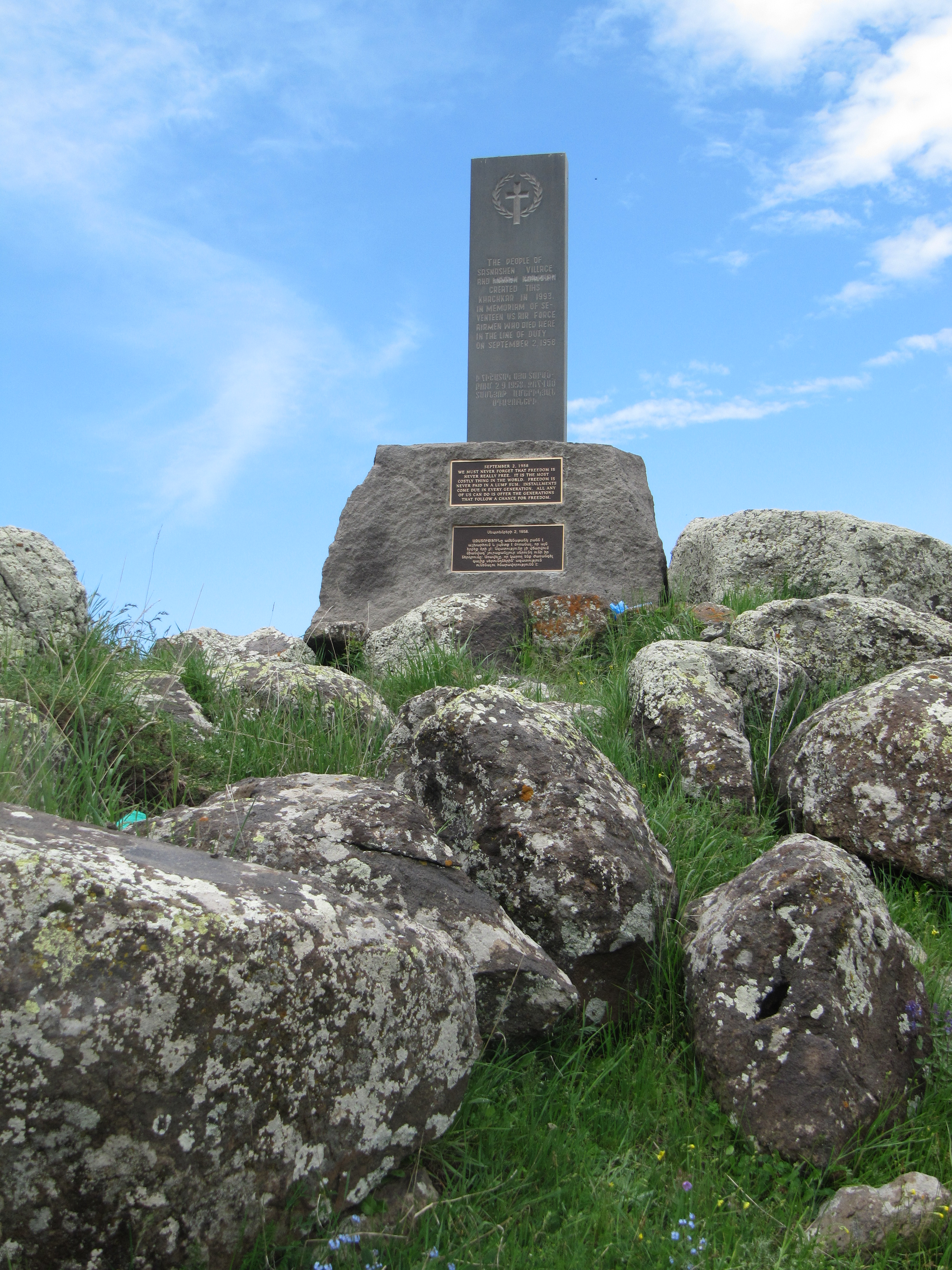
Joint US-Armenian memorial to the 1958 C-130 shootdown incident
