= National Vigilance Park =

- National Security Agency
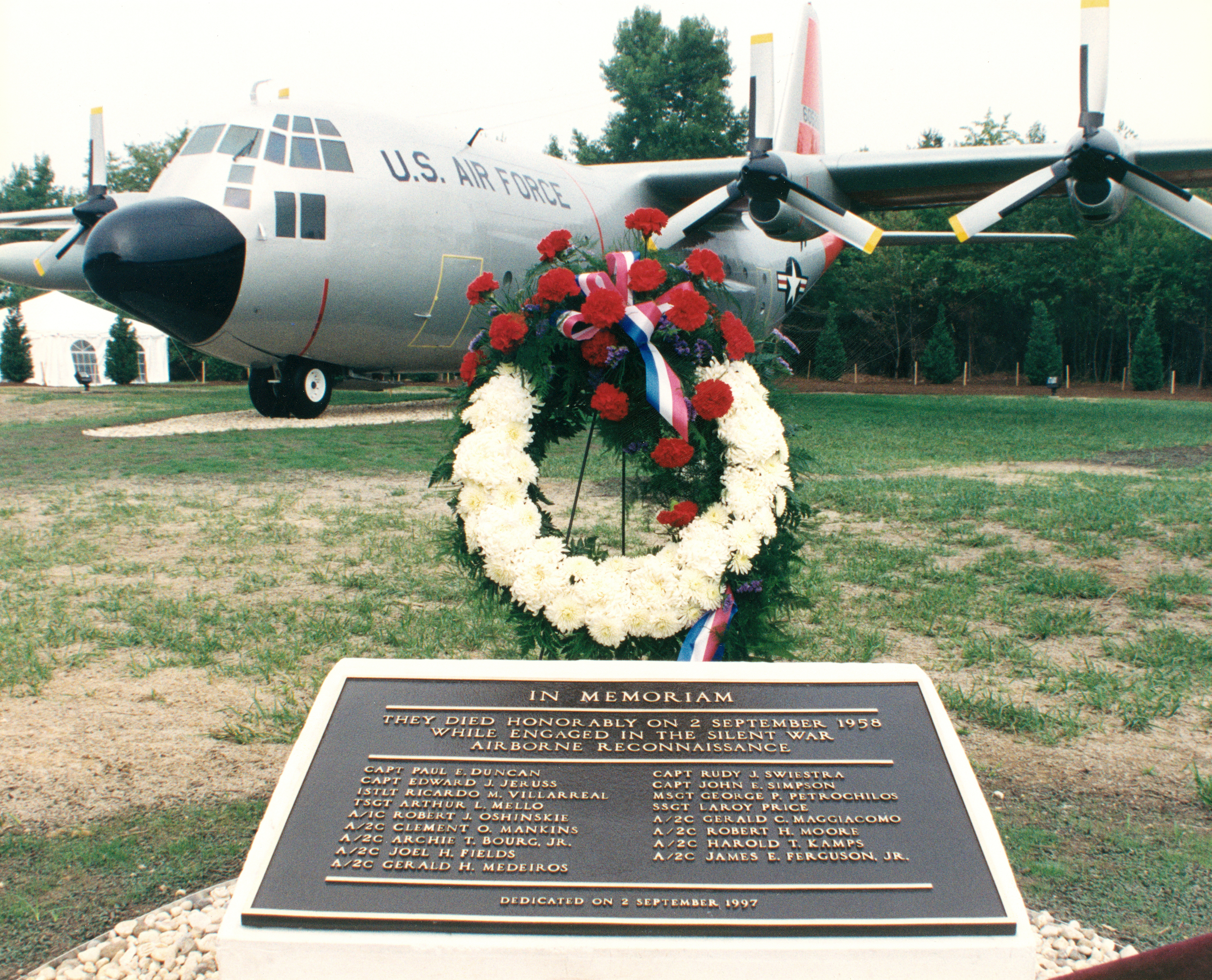
- A Hercules C-130 aircraft on display at National Vigilance Park
- For All Personnel Who Served in U.S. Military Aerial Reconnaissance During the Cold War
- Unveiled: September 2, 1997
- Location: 39.1119°N 76.7748°W near Ft. Meade, Maryland

The United States National Vigilance Park (NVP) was a memorial to the military servicemen who participated in aerial reconnaissance during the Cold War. Dedicated on September 2, 1997, NVP was located just one block from the National Security Agency (NSA) headquarters at Fort George G. Meade, Maryland. It was previously open 24 hours a day for viewing. Military events connected with the Intelligence Community and/or personnel stationed at Ft. Meade or working at NSA were formerly scheduled through the National Cryptologic Museum (NCM), which is just one block west of the former park.

When NVP was open to the public, admission was free. Donations to the NCM Foundation are still accepted for potential reopening of the park. Photographing the planes and the memorial plaques, decor, and grounds was allowed when they were on site; however, pictures of the adjacent NSA buildings were not permitted due to security concerns.

== The memorial ==
Three reconnaissance aircraft were on display at the memorial, which were ringed by a semicircle of 18 trees representing the 18 aerial cryptologic missions lost during the program. A U.S. Army Seminole RU-8D Reconnaissance Plane represented the Army Airborne Signals Intelligence contribution in the Vietnam War. A Hercules C-130 transport, tail number 60528, modified to look like a reconnaissance-configuration C-130A, memorialized a U.S. Air Force aircraft shot down over Soviet Armenia during the Cold War. Finally, the park contained a U.S. Navy Skywarrior EA-3B, commemorating a mission in the Mediterranean on January 25, 1987 in which all seven crew members died.

== Closure ==
National Vigilance Park was closed in February 2017, and its aircraft and memorials removed to allow for the construction of a new NSA visitor checkpoint. In 2018, Google Maps satellite imagery depicted the in-progress removal of the aircraft. Also in 2018, the official NSA website for NVP reported the park would reopen at an undetermined time in the future next to the NCM.

== See also ==
- National Security Agency/Central Security Service Cryptologic Memorial
- National Cryptologic Museum
- Bletchley Park
- Arlington Hall
- International Spy Museum
- Moscow–Washington hotline
- United States aerial reconnaissance of the Soviet Union

== Notes ==
- John R. Schindler, "A Dangerous Business: The U.S. Navy and National Reconnaissance During the Cold War", 1997.
