= Vadim Shcherbakov =

Vadim Petrovich Shcherbakov (Russian: Вадим Петрович Щербаков) was an officer in the Soviet Air Defense Forces (PVO Strany). As a senior lieutenant, he was serving in the 260th "Bryansky" Anti-Aircraft Missile Regiment. In 1966–1967 Shcherbakov's whole regiment was temporarily assigned as a Group of Soviet Military Advisors in Vietnam (Группа советских военных специалистов во Вьетнаме) and in March 1966 was transferred to North Vietnam, where the regiment was tasked with establishing a training center and training the NVA's 274th Anti-Aircraft Missile Regiment for combat duty. In North Vietnam Shcherbakov served as a SAM operator/instructor, and specialized as a fire control operator during combat deployments. For his service Shcherbakov received the Order of Lenin, the highest Soviet decoration after returning from North Vietnam in 1967.

American Task Force Russia: POW/MIA in their 18th report claims that formerly closed Soviet sources credited Colonel Shchbakov with 10 combat engagements and 6 kills. After Vietnam, Shcherbakov continued his service, eventually reaching the rank of colonel. Very little is known about his biography except for multiple brief mentions in Soviet Officers' Vietnam War memoirs. He was still alive in 1991, when he was attending an annual meeting of the Russian Association of Vietnam War veterans. He was a retired Colonel at that time.

(Note: Colonel Shcherbakov had been named as a pilot/instructor during a Task Force Russia report in 1992/93 (TFR 18 report) Col Shchbakov was credited with 3 possible aerial victories; two US (RB/EB)B-66s and one F-105 Thunderchief (tail #59-1725) flown by US pilot LTC Donald Henry Asire. No RB/EB-66s were downed in the time period claimed, and Asire's F-105 had been chased into the ground by pursuing North Vietnamese MiG-17s Although official North Vietnamese Air Force (NVAF) records indictate that two F-105s were shot down by NVAF MiG-21s on 8 December 1966 from the NVAF's 921st Regiment. Two RB/EB-66s were shot down in 1966 however, but not by MiGs; they were shot down by North Vietnamese SAMs on 25 Feb and 20 July 1966 by Soviet manned surface to air missiles, which from 1965 thru nearly all of 1966 were strictly manned by Soviet personnel.)

Shcherbakov appears to have lived in Engels, Saratov Oblast, as of 2013.
