= Project HOMERUN =

US aerial intelligence operation against USSR in 1956–60

HOMERUN was a secret US aerial reconnaissance operation against the USSR in 1956.

== History ==
Project HOMERUN was conducted between March and May 1956. During that time RB-47E and RB-47H reconnaissance aircraft flew almost daily flights over the North Pole to photograph and gather electronic intelligence over the entire northern section of the Soviet Union.

Project Homerun used 16 RB-47Es from the 10th SRS and five RB-47Hs from the 343rd SRS. 156 sorties were performed.

On a typical RB-47H reconnaissance mission covering 5,984 mi (9,360 km), the aircraft would fly from Thule Air Base, Greenland, to the Kara Sea to Murmansk and then return only to find Thule weathered-in, forcing the flight from the air-refueling/decision point near the northeast shore of Greenland to one of three equidistant alternates: Goose Bay, Labrador, London, or Fairbanks, Alaska. Five KC-97s at Thule were required to support this scenario. Two ground spares and one air spare ensured two 20,000 lb (9,090 kg) fuel transfers at a distance of over 600 mi (965 km) from Thule. Tankers returned to Thule to refuel and again repeat the flight to intercept the returning RB-47H six hours later for another air refueling.

When the Soviet government filed an angry complaint with the US government, the US government attributed the overflights to "navigational difficulties".

== See also ==
- 1960 RB-47 shootdown incident
- United States aerial reconnaissance of the Soviet Union
