= Lockheed RC-130 Hercules =

Military reconnaissance aircraft mainly used in the U.S. Air Force

RC-130 Hercules
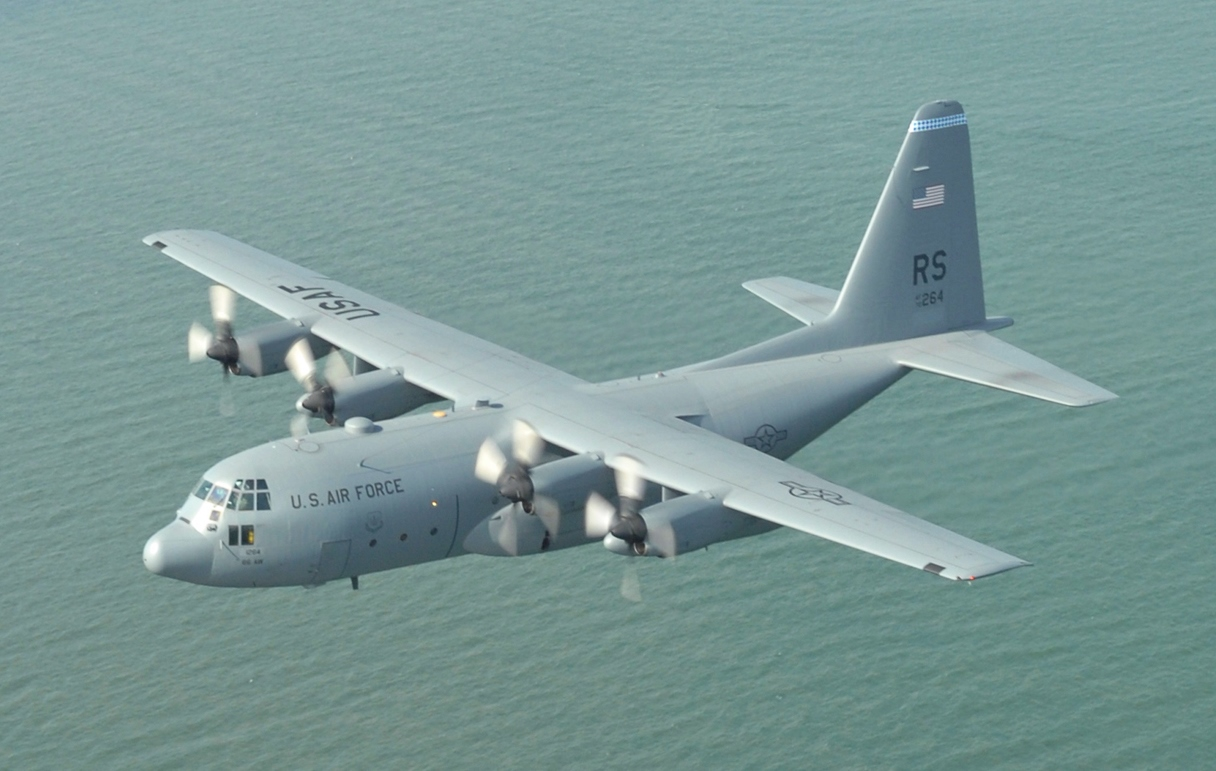
- A C-130 similar to this one, can be modified for reconnaissance

General information
- Type: Military reconnaissance aircraft
- National origin: United States
- Manufacturer: Lockheed
- Status: Retired
- Primary user: United States Air Force

History
- Manufactured: 15
- First flight: 1958
- Developed from: Lockheed C-130 Hercules

The Lockheed RC-130 Hercules are retired variants of the C-130 Hercules, designed for photographic or electronic reconnaissance missions.

== Operational history ==
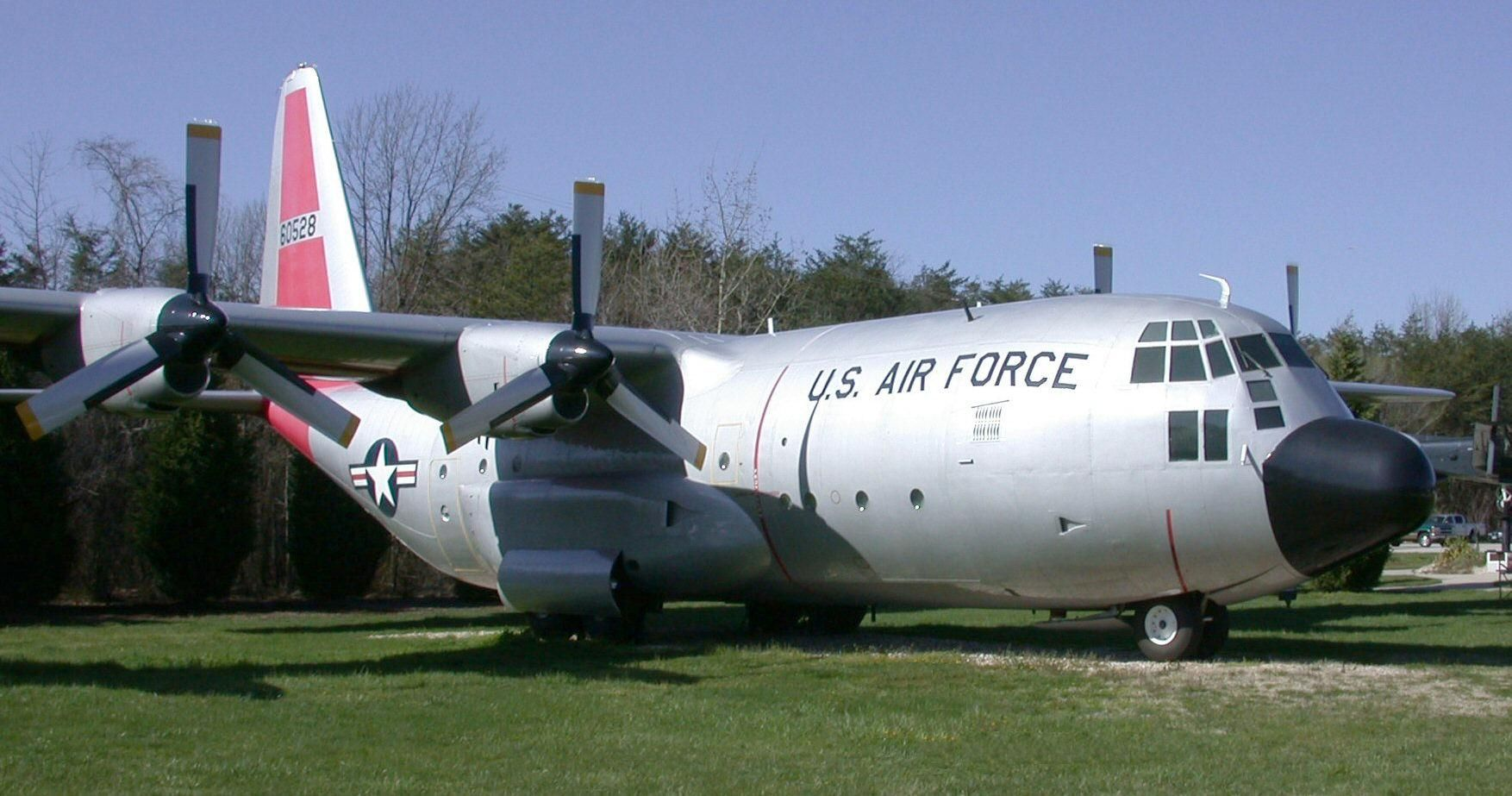
A replica of 56–0528, a C-130A-II "Sun Valley" reconnaissance aircraft shot down over Armenia, Soviet Union, in 1958, on display at the National Cryptologic Museum, Fort Meade, Maryland

On 2 September 1958, C-130A-II 56-0528 was shot down after it intruded into Soviet airspace during a reconnaissance mission along the Turkish-Armenian border.

== Variants ==
C-130A-II
Electronics reconnaissance variant for use by 7407th Combat Support Wing, ten conversions from C-130A.
RC-130A
Photo reconnaissance variant, one converted from a TC-130A and 15 built new.
C-130B-II
Electronic reconnaissance variant, 15 converted from C-130B later designated RC-130B.
RC-130B
Re-designated from C-130B-II, all later converted back to C-130Bs.
RC-130S
Two JC-130A aircraft were modified with the Battlefield Illumination Airborne System (BIAS) for night search-and rescue missions with the 446th Tactical Airlift Wing.

== Former Operators ==
United States

- United States Air Force

== See also ==
Related development

- Lockheed C-130 Hercules – American military transport aircraft
- Lockheed AC-130 – Gunship aircraft series by Lockheed
- Lockheed DC-130 – American military UAV carrier
- Lockheed EC-130 – 1975 electronic warfare aircraft series by Lockheed
- Lockheed EC-130H Compass Call – Communications jamming aircraft version of the C-130H Hercules
- Lockheed HC-130 – Search and rescue aircraft version of the C-130 Hercules
- Lockheed L-100 Hercules – Turboprop transport aircraft
- Lockheed LC-130 – Ski-equipped military transport aircraft
- Lockheed Martin C-130J Super Hercules – Military transport aircraft
- Lockheed Martin KC-130 – Aerial refueling tanker based on Lockheed Martin C-130
- Lockheed MC-130 – Special mission military aircraft
- Lockheed WC-130 – Weather aircraft series by Lockheed

Related lists

- List of accidents and incidents involving the Lockheed C-130 Hercules

== Bibliography ==
- Francillon, René. Lockheed Aircraft since 1913. London: Putnam, 1982. ISBN 0-370-30329-6.
