= 1960 RB-47 shootdown incident =

1960 aviation accident

RB-47 shootdown incident of 1960
- Part of the Cold War
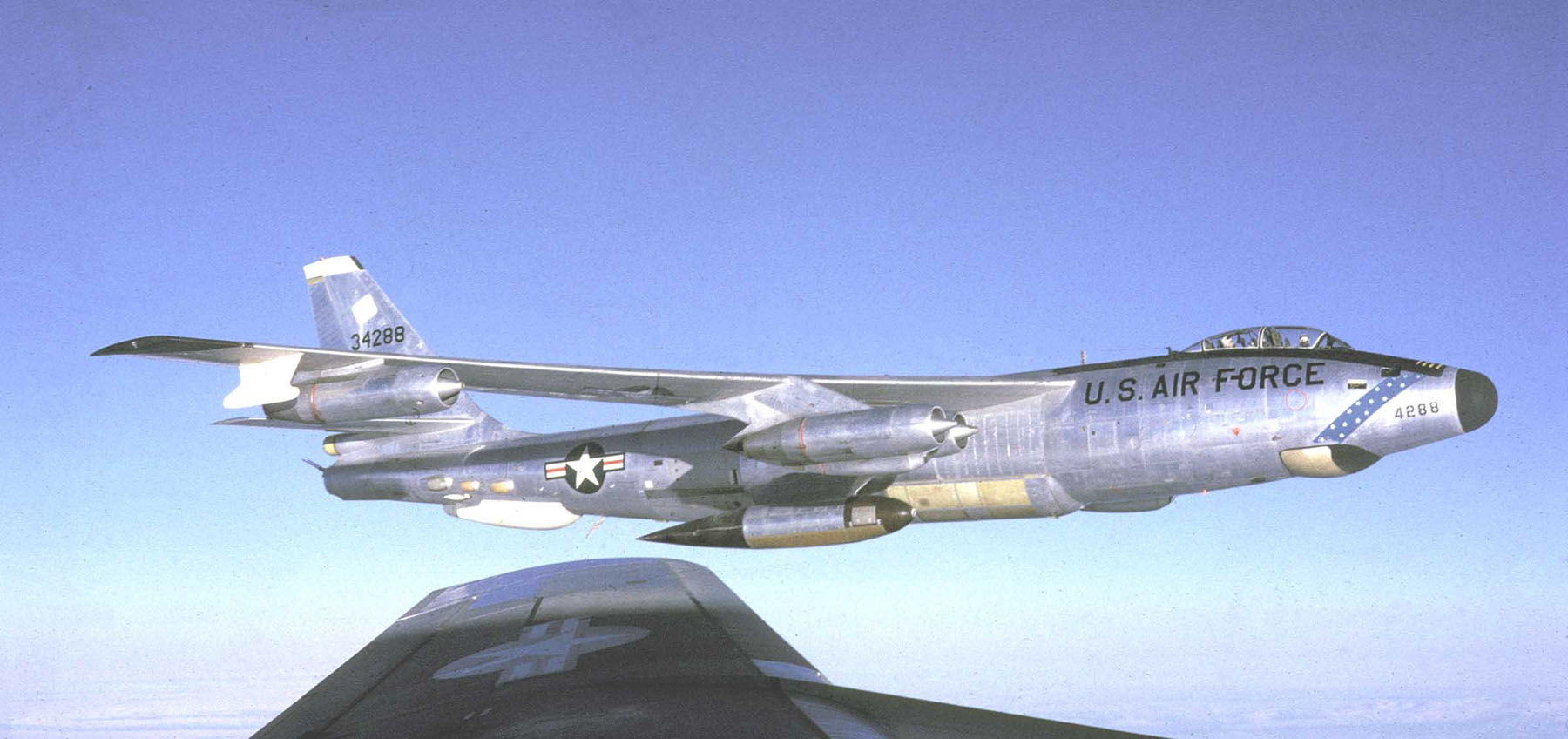
- Type: Aircraft shot down
- Location: Barents Sea, near Kola Peninsula
- Objective: Intercept American RB-47H spy aircraft
- Date: 1 July 1960
- Executed by: Soviet Air Defense Forces
- Casualties: 4 killed

On 1 July 1960, a United States RB-47H reconnaissance plane was shot down by the Soviet Air Defence Forces while performing signals intelligence in the Barents Sea, near the Kola Peninsula, off the Arctic coast of the Soviet Union. Four of the six crew members died. The shootdown occurred exactly two months after the far better known U-2 shootdown involving Francis Gary Powers, and added to the tensions created by that incident.

The plane was part of the 55th Strategic Reconnaissance Wing and took off from RAF Brize Norton airbase in the United Kingdom. It was shot down by Soviet pilot Vasily Polyakov in a MiG-19. The US position was that the plane was in international airspace, and this was later corroborated by information provided by spy Oleg Penkovsky.

Three of the crewmen (reconnaissance officers Capt. Oscar Goforth, Capt. Dean Phillips, and Capt. Eugene Posa) were missing in action, and the remains of one other (aircraft commander Maj. Willard Palm) were recovered. The two survivors, navigator Captain John R. McKone and co-pilot Captain Freeman "Bruce" Olmstead, were picked up by Soviet fishing trawlers and held in Lubyanka prison in Moscow until immediately after the inauguration of newly elected US President John F. Kennedy on 20 January 1961, when they were released by Soviet leader Nikita Khrushchev as a goodwill gesture.

McKone and Olmstead appeared on the cover of the 3 February 1961 issue of Time magazine. In his news conference on 21 April 1961, Kennedy was asked if the dropping of charges against an accused Soviet spy was in exchange for the release of the RB-47 aviators. The president denied this.

As a result of their involvement in the incident, Olmstead and McKone received POW medals in 1996 and Silver Star medals in 2004, as well as the Distinguished Flying Cross.

== See also ==
- United States aerial reconnaissance of the Soviet Union

General:

- Cold War (1953–1962)

Analogous incidents:

- 1958 C-130 shootdown incident
- 1960 U-2 incident
- Hainan Island incident
