= 1958 C-130 shootdown incident =

Cold War event in Armenian SSR

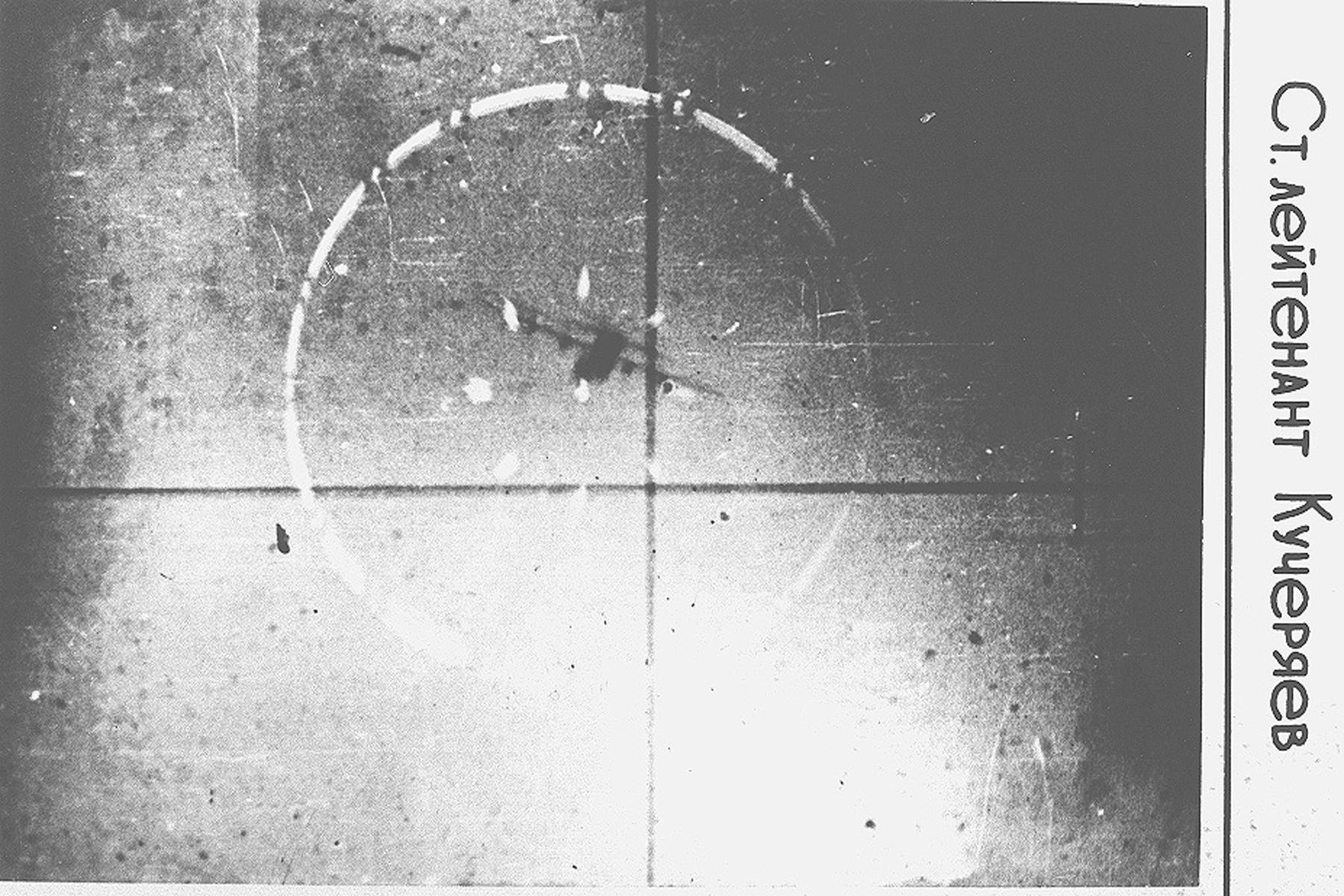
- The gun-camera photo from Sr. Lieutenant Kucheryaev as his MiG-17 attacks the C-130C

Incident
- Date: September 2, 1958
- Summary: Shot down by four Mikoyan-Gurevich MiG-17 interceptors
- Site: near Yerevan, Armenian SSR, Soviet Union; 40°33′0″N 44°6′0″E

Aircraft
- Aircraft type: Lockheed C-130A-II-LM
- Operator: United States Air Force on behalf of the USAFSS
- Registration: 56-0528
- Flight origin: Incirlik Air Base, Turkey
- Destination: Incirlik Air Base, Turkey
- Occupants: 17
- Passengers: 11 mission crew from the United States Air Force Security Service (USAFSS)
- Crew: 6
- Fatalities: 17 (presumed – only the six flight crew remains were repatriated at the time)
- Survivors: 0

The 1958 C-130 shootdown incident was the shooting down of an American Lockheed C-130A-II-LM reconnaissance aircraft which entered Soviet airspace during a mission in the region of Armenian SSR.

== Incident ==
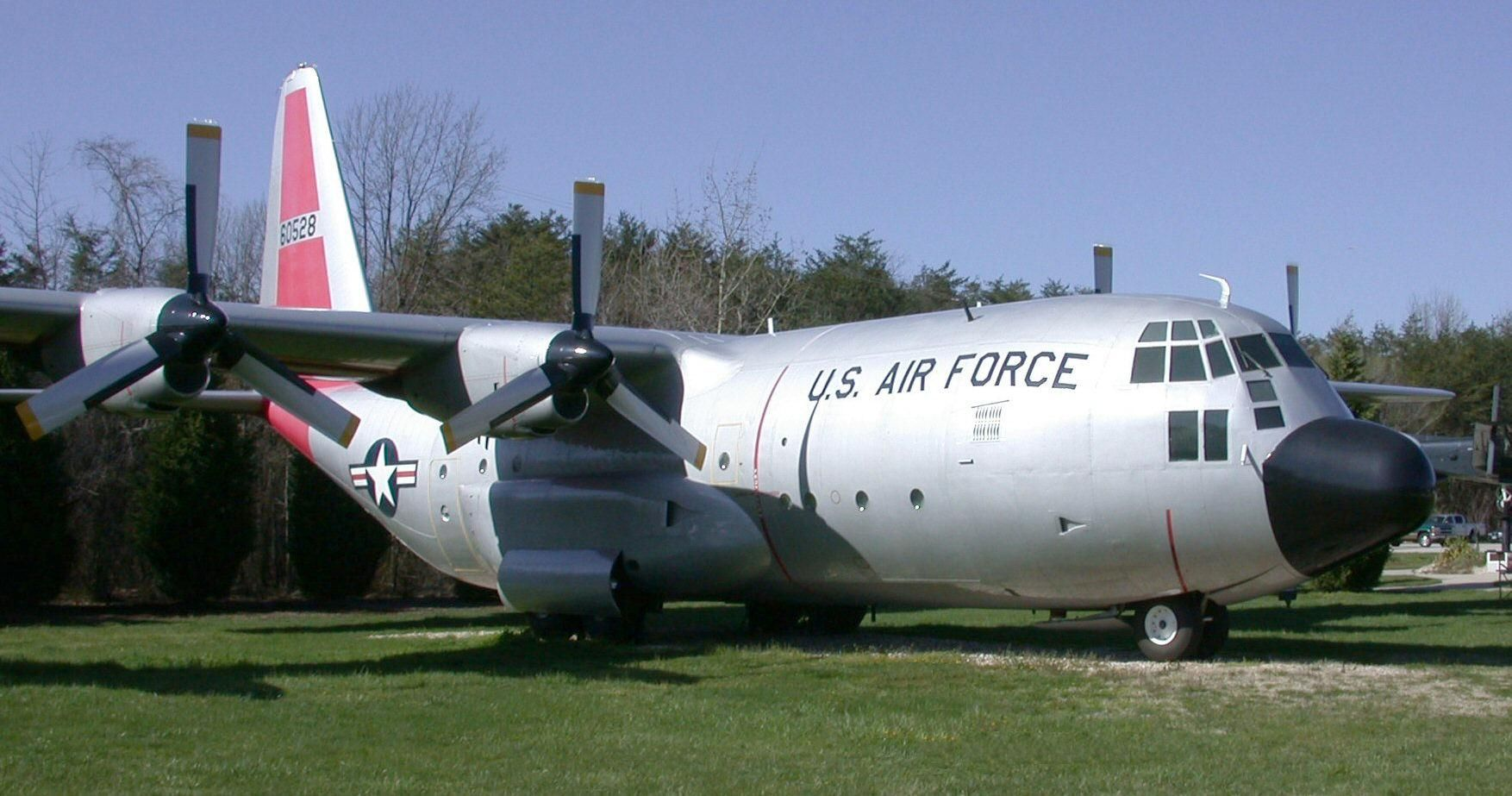
130A-45-LM (57-0453), modified to represent 56-0528, on display at the National Cryptologic Museum, Fort Meade, MD

On September 2, 1958, a Lockheed C-130A-II-LM (s/n 56-0528), from the 7406th Support Squadron, departed Incirlik Airbase in Turkey on a reconnaissance mission along the Turkish-Soviet border. It was to fly a course parallel to the frontier, but not approach the border closer than 100 miles (160 km). The crew reported passing over Trabzon in Turkey at 25,500 feet (7,800 m) and then acknowledged a weather report from Trabzon, but that was the last communication received from the flight. It was later intercepted and shot down by four Soviet MiG-17s 34 mi (55 km; 30 nmi) north-west of Yerevan.

== Aftermath ==
The six flight crew were confirmed dead when their remains were repatriated to the United States, but the 11 intelligence-gathering personnel on board have never been acknowledged by Soviet / Russian authorities. In 1993, after the fall of the Soviet Union, a US excavation team working in newly-independent Armenia found hundreds of skeletal fragments; two remains were identified. A group burial of the 17 crew remains was held at Arlington National Cemetery.

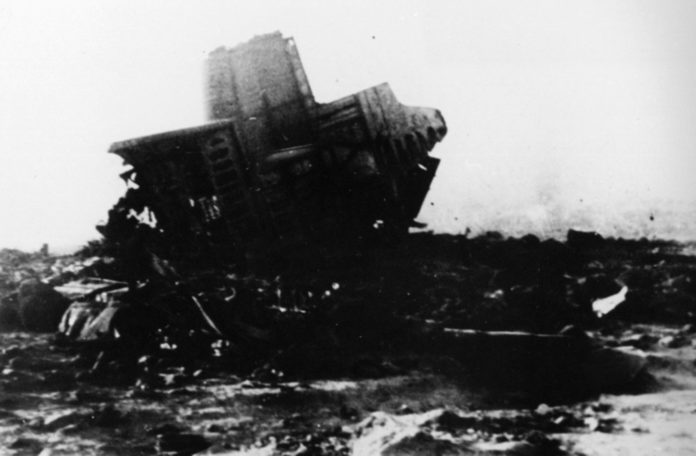
The crash site of 60528

== Reasons for entering Soviet airspace ==
The exact cause of why the aircraft strayed into Soviet airspace is unknown, but according to the Aviation Safety Network, the crew may have confused a radio beacon in the USSR with similar frequencies to the Turkish beacons they were briefed to use, or it may have been a deliberate maneuver to obtain better data.

When NSA cryptologists William Hamilton Martin and Bernon F. Mitchell defected to the Soviet Union in 1960, they listed the C-130 flight as one of their reasons. They contended that it was designed to gain an understanding of Soviet defenses, and that it therefore possibly represented an American interest in attacking the Soviets rather than defending against them. James Bamford, an investigative journalist and author, agreed that their assertions had merit.

== Memorial ==
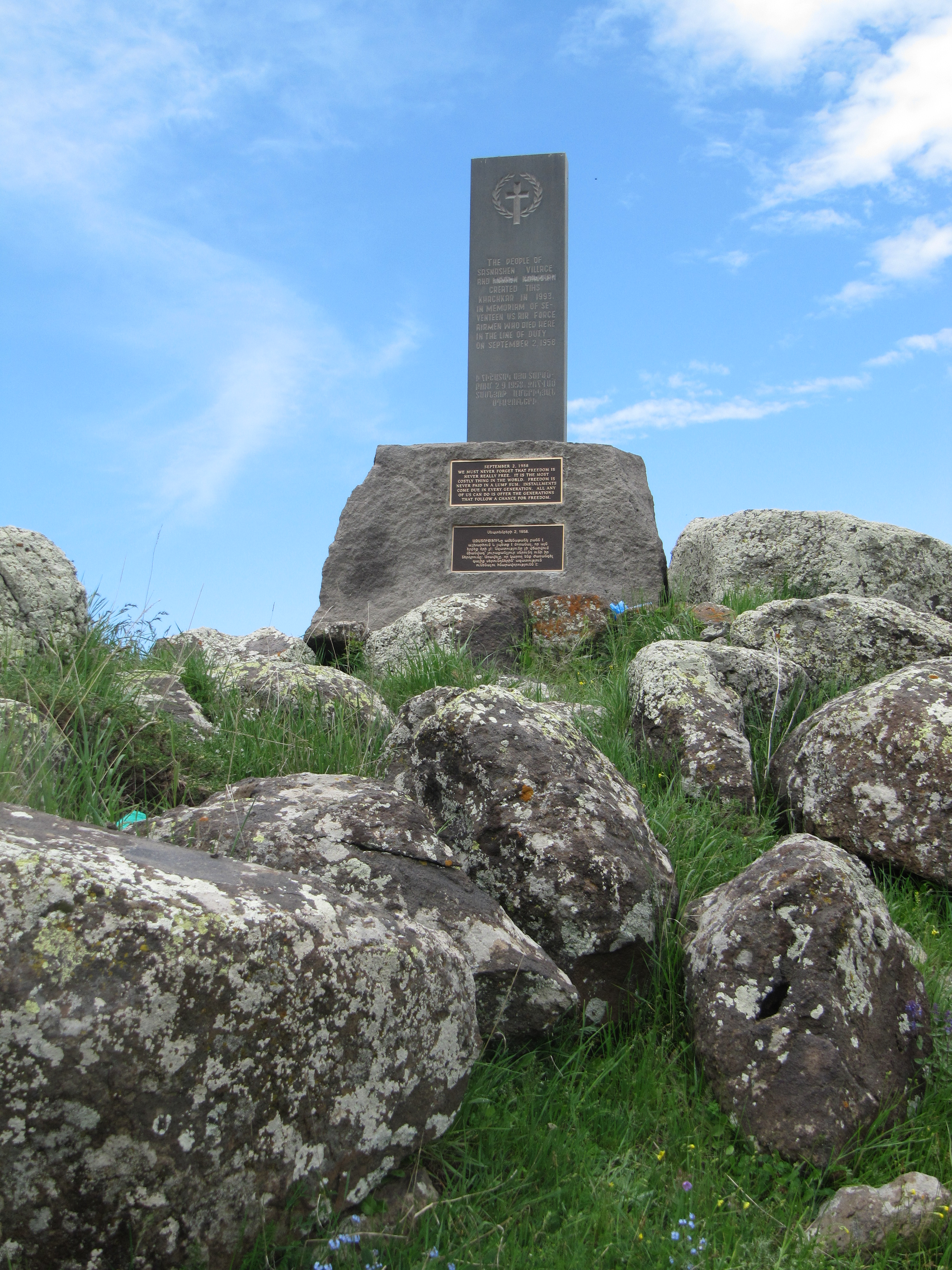
Joint US-Armenian memorial stone in Sasnashen, Armenia

In 1993, Armenian sculptor Martin Kakosian unveiled a khachkar, a traditional Armenian cross stone, at the site of the aircraft's crash in the village of Nerkin Sasnashen. Kakosian had witnessed the crash as a college student on a field trip in 1958. This khachkar later fell over and cracked, and a joint US-Armenian memorial was built to commemorate the site. In 2011, the US Army Office of Defense Cooperation renovated the village kindergarten in appreciation of the villagers' commemoration of the downed airmen.

== Media ==
The shootdown features in the British documentary "Spies in the Sky" (October 22, 1994), an edition in the BBC's Timewatch' series. It includes footage of the 1993 unveiling of the Nerkin Sasnashen memorial, attended by the sister of one of the USAF crewmen.

== See also ==
- 1960 RB-47 shootdown incident
- 1960 U-2 incident
- Air-to-air combat losses between the Soviet Union and the United States
- Martin and Mitchell defection
