= United States aerial reconnaissance of the Soviet Union =

Fixed-wing overflights, 1946–1960

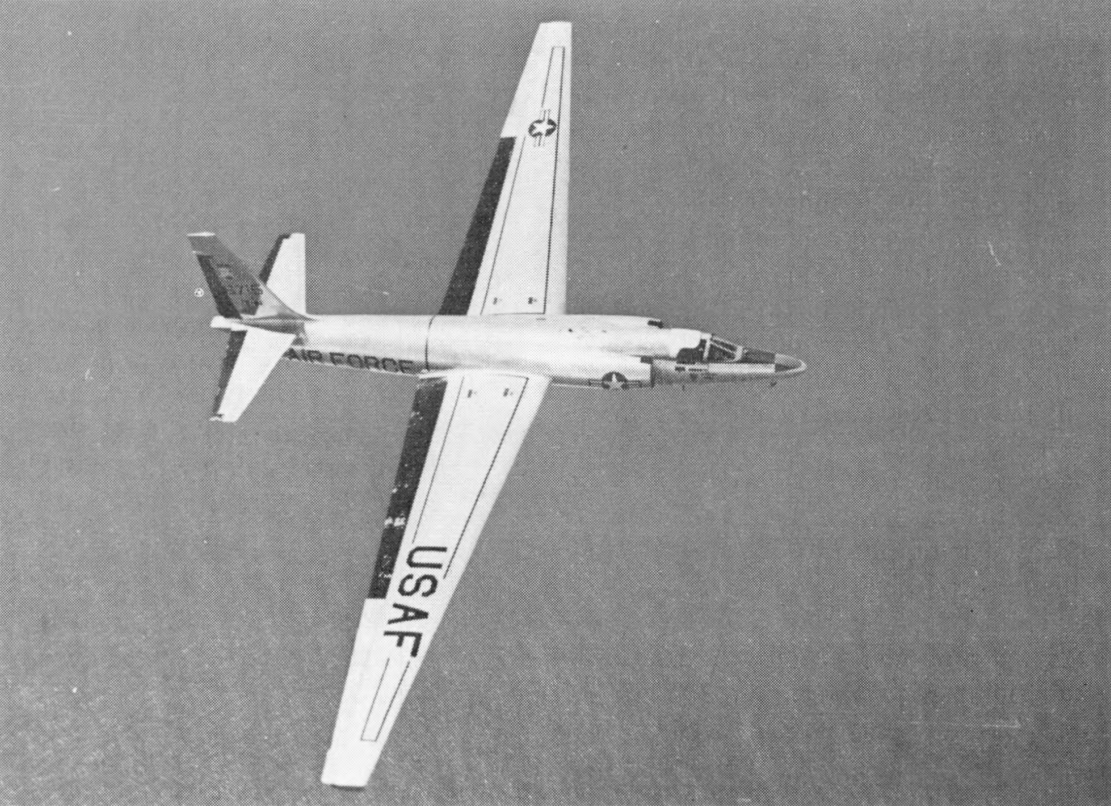
U-2A reconnaissance aircraft, late 1950s

Between 1946 and 1960, the United States Air Force conducted aerial reconnaissance flights over the Soviet Union in order to determine the size, composition, and disposition of Soviet forces. Aircraft used included the Boeing B-47 Stratojet bomber and—from 1956—the Lockheed U-2 spy plane specifically designed for high-altitude reconnaissance flight. The overflight program was ended following the 1960 U-2 incident.

== Background ==
After the second world war, the Iron Curtain made it hard for the United States to gather information in regards to the Soviet Union. The information gathered before the start of the reconnaissance flights were hugely limited and failed to satisfy what the U.S. intelligence sector wanted. Reconnaissance flights with fixed-wing jet aircraft began in 1946 along the borders of the Soviet Union and other Eastern Bloc states. The necessity of peacetime overflights was reinforced after the escalation of the Cold War in the late 1940s, and in particular after the Korean War began in 1950. U.S. President Harry S. Truman authorized selected overflights of the Soviet Union in order to determine the status of its air forces. It was feared that the Soviets might launch a surprise aerial attack on the United States with long-range bombers.

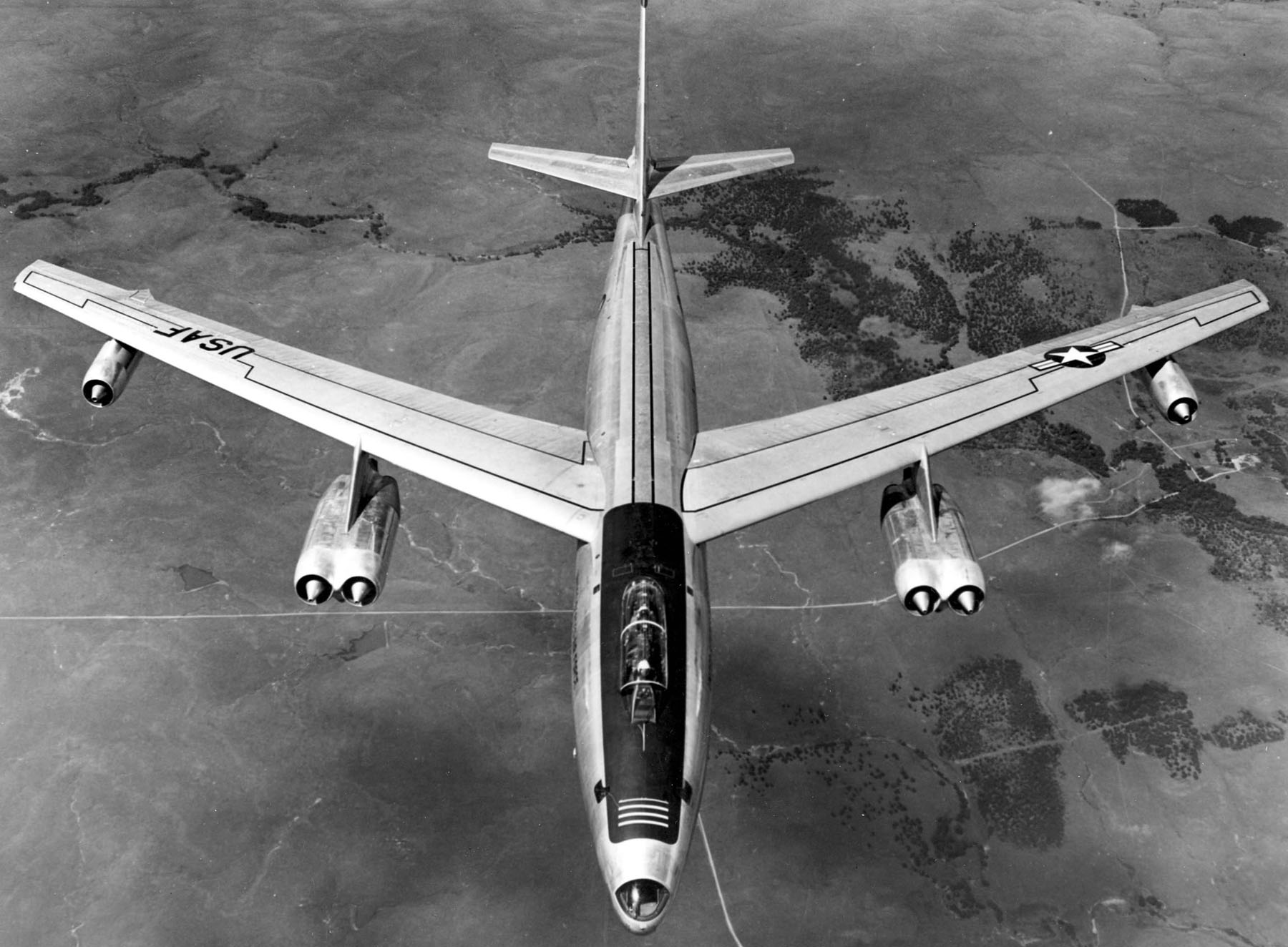
RB-47E reconnaissance bomber, mid-1950s

During this same period (the late 1940s), the United States still held a nuclear monopoly (as the sole possessor of nuclear weapons), but atomic scientists predicted that the monopoly would end eventually, although perhaps not until circa 1955. It was a foregone conclusion that other countries would be scrambling to develop their own nuclear capabilities; the Americans and British already knew that the Soviet Union was doing so, although they had failed to realize how thoroughly penetrated by spies the Manhattan Project had been until the damage was already done. But on top of that certainty, another real possibility was that other countries could develop nuclear weapons in secret and then be nuclear-capable without the United States even knowing that they had become so, which posed a strategic problem even thornier than the one posed by at least knowing when others had become nuclear-capable. The United States military and executive branch were thus keenly interested in having nuclear detonation detection capabilities, for which no deployable systems yet existed; the ideas for them were still just brainstorms and tentative experiments. They included seismometer networks, air sampling for isotope traces, hydroacoustic soundwaves in oceans, and atmospheric infrasound waves; another idea was artificial satellites, although no one yet knew how many years or decades it would take to create artificial satellites. (The answer turned out to be one decade.) In this environment, while grander replacements were still under development, the United States pressed forward with initial efforts such as Project Mogul, in which high-altitude observation balloons (analogous to weather balloons but thoroughly differentiable in the technical details suited to the purpose) would perform reconnaissance and surveillance via any combination of air sampling for isotopes, soundwave detection, and film photography.

== Cross-border droppings ==
On several occasions in 1951–1952, CIA planes flew over the Soviet territory, penetrating the airspace near the borders of its westernmost republics (the Moldavian, Ukrainian, and Byelorussian Soviet Socialist Republics,) dropping parachutist agents recruited in the West from the Soviet defectors (the AEDEPOT project.) Most of the landed agents were captured by the Soviet troops and government agencies. The agents were disguised as ordinary Soviet citizens, and equipped with fake Soviet passports, guns, grenades, explosives, disguised firing devices, and other spy equipment. They were detailed to contact local anti-Soviet rebels, and engage in a guerrilla warfare against the local Soviet authorities. William Blum has also claimed in Killing Hope that the CIA worked with the anti-communist group National Alliance of Russian Solidarists (NTS) in covert operations inside the Soviet Union. Blum claims the CIA covertly trained, equipped, armed and financed the NTS out of West Germany and secretly dropped their operatives as paratroopers into Soviet territory. From there, Blum claims these groups engaged in actions such as assassinations, stealing documents, derailing trains, wrecking bridges and sabotaging power plants and weapons factories. The Soviet Union claimed it caught two dozen of these operatives, including a former Nazi collaborator, and subsequently had them executed. The information gathered from these flights helped the United States in developing war plans and guiding policy through other international crisis.

== First deep-penetration flights ==
In 1947, an RB-29, of Alaskan Air Command, was on a reconnaissance mission and flew along the coast of the Chukotskiy Peninsula. The plane did not get into Soviet Union air space, but the Soviet officials in Washington D.C. delivered a diplomatic protest against the State Department and stated that the American bomber had approached within 2 miles of the Soviet Union shore. The officials wanted a guarantee from the US against future territorial violations, but the US denied any violation taking place.

In 1952 a modified B-47B bomber made the first deep-penetration United States overflight of Soviet territory to photograph Siberian air bases. The overflight was due to intelligence received by the United States stating that the Soviet Air Force had begun placing bombers in Siberia. These bombers, if loaded with nuclear weapons, could make one-way flights to the United States and strike the country. Limited periphery flights had already been conducted by American aircraft, including the signals intelligence P4M, RB-29, RB-50, RB-36, and RB-47.

Overflights of the Soviet Union with the newly designated RB-47Es started in 1954, often at great risk as they were routinely intercepted by Soviet MiGs. It became apparent that a new aircraft was needed which could operate at altitudes well above any Soviet air defenses.

== U-2 missions ==
In November 1954, President Dwight D. Eisenhower approved a secret program under the direction of the Central Intelligence Agency to build and fly a special-purpose high-altitude reconnaissance aircraft with the code name AQUATONE. Lockheed was chosen to build the reconnaissance plane and in August 1955 the first Lockheed U-2 was test-flown. The U-2 was chosen as the plane to use because of its operational flexibility, amazing aerodynamic design, and adaptable airframe. With all of the pros of the plane, the U-2 would make a great number of trips over the Soviet Union. The US was able to gain intelligence in regards to early strategic nuclear capabilities by utilizing the U-2 spy plane.

Other strategic reconnaissance missions continued as the U-2 tests were ongoing. In early 1956 Project Genetrix involved hundreds of high-altitude photographic reconnaissance balloons that were intended to collect intelligence as they drifted across the Soviet Union; only 51 balloons were recovered, however and just 31 of those provided any usable photos.

During Project HOMERUN (between March and May 1956) RB-47E reconnaissance aircraft flew almost daily flights over the North Pole to photograph and gather electronic intelligence over the entire northern section of the Soviet Union.

On 6 May 1956 six reconnaissance bombers, flying abreast, crossed the North Pole and penetrated Soviet airspace in broad daylight as if on a nuclear bombing run. Any Soviet radar operator seeing the bombers would have no way of knowing that the mission was an act of espionage and not of war.

On 4 July 1956 the first U-2 flight over the Soviet Union took place. Soviet leader Nikita Khrushchev angrily protested this overflight and feared that "when they understand that we are defenseless against an aerial attack, it will push the Americans to begin the war earlier." This prompted the Soviet Union to develop new air defense systems.

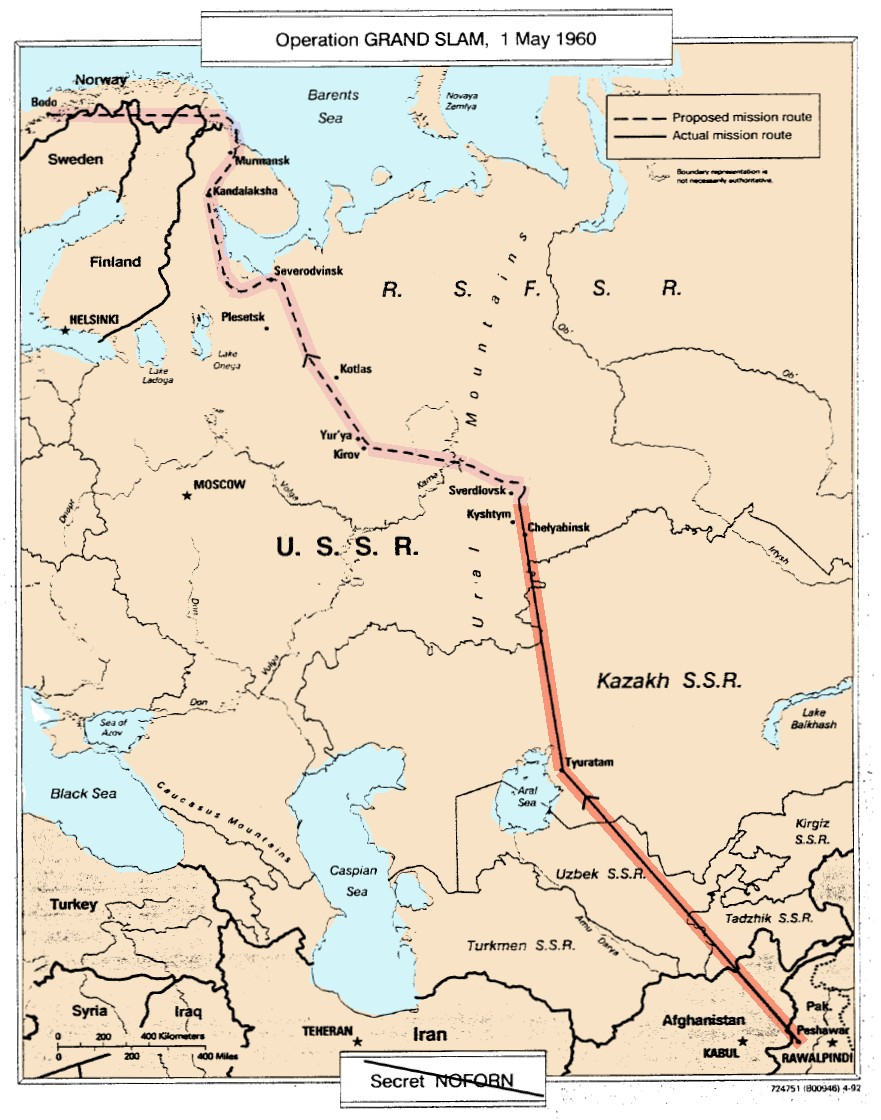
U-2 "GRAND SLAM" flight plan on 1 May 1960, from CIA publication The Central Intelligence Agency and Overhead Reconnaissance; The U-2 And Oxcart Programs, 1954–1974, declassified 25 June 2013

Strategic overflight reconnaissance in peacetime became routine U.S. policy. The CIA's Project OXCART, an aircraft which flew even higher and four times faster than the U-2, advanced aerial overflight reconnaissance capabilities with eventual development of the Lockheed SR-71 Blackbird.

== Discontinuance ==
This form of espionage stopped in 1960 when the Soviet Union announced it had shot down a U-2 plane. Eisenhower believed little evidence had survived the crash and so stated the plane was just a weather plane. However, the Soviets provided a photograph of the imprisoned pilot, Francis Gary Powers. After some time the United States would issue an admission that stated that the US had used aircraft to engage in intelligence flights over the Soviet Union. Following the incident, Eisenhower ordered an end to American reconnaissance flights over the Soviet Union. This policy was upheld by President Kennedy. On 25 January 1961 he told a press conference, "I have ordered that the flights not be resumed, which is a continuation of the order given by President Eisenhower in May of last year."

Kennedy's successor, Lyndon B. Johnson, elected to continue the policy of no overflights. Improvements in technology during the 1960s allowed satellite reconnaissance which was immune to interception and provided much of the same information that could be obtained by reconnaissance aircraft, thus rendering aerial overflights unnecessary. In 1964 CIA director John A. McCone emphasized to the Johnson administration the orders were not a pledge barring further flights, but simply a directive that the flights not be resumed, one which can be countermanded.

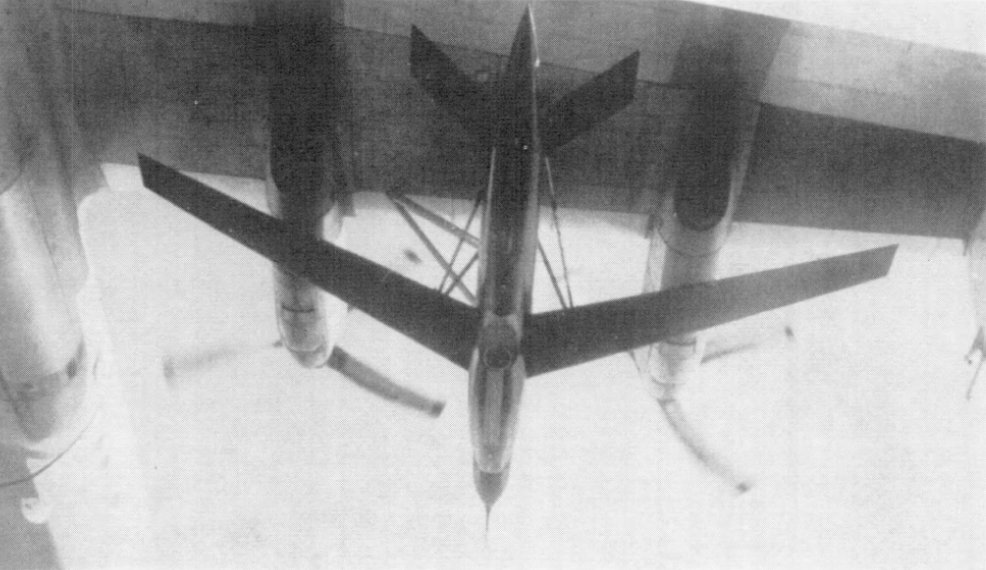
Ryan Model 147B high-altitude reconnaissance RPV under wing of a DC-130A launch aircraft, mid-1960s

In spite of the formal end to reconnaissance aircraft overflights, the U.S. remained involved in overflight attempts of its Cold War adversaries. Project Dark Gene, a CIA–Iranian program of intrusions into Soviet airspace to explore Soviet air defense systems, continued operations up to 1979. Aerial reconnaissance of mainland China continued with the Ryan Model 147 "Lightning Bug" RPVs (Remotely Piloted Vehicles); several of these drones were shot down or recovered by the Chinese during the Vietnam War era. Flights over China were also made, with little success, by the Lockheed D-21 drone. China overflight efforts prevailed into the 1970s with proxy U-2 missions flown by Taiwanese pilots.

== Legacy ==
More than 40 U.S. aircraft were downed by Soviet forces and 200 Americans were killed during these operations. Their families were given false information by the military on the circumstances of their deaths. Dmitry Volkogonov, a former Soviet and Russian general and historian, has claimed that more than 730 pilots and airmen were captured and arrested after making forced landings or having their aircraft shot down.

In the 1960s through 1990s, US aircraft would continue to do aerial reconnaissance and surveillance up to the edges of Soviet borders and airspace; for example, with reconnaissance aircraft (such as the A-12 and SR-71) and surveillance aircraft (such as the RC-135U and EP-3), but no more overflights would be done, because of the high likelihood of being shot down by surface-to-air missiles.

== See also ==
- National Vigilance Park
- Donald E. Hillman
- List of United States Air Force reconnaissance aircraft
