= List of accidents and incidents involving military aircraft (1955–1959) =

This is a list of notable accidents and incidents involving military aircraft grouped by the year in which the accident or incident occurred. Not all of the aircraft were in operation at the time. Combat losses are not included except for a very few cases denoted by singular circumstances.

== Aircraft terminology ==
Information on aircraft gives the type, and if available, the serial number of the operator in italics, the construction number (c/n), also known as the manufacturer's serial number, exterior codes in apostrophes, nicknames (if any) in quotation marks, flight call sign in italics, and operating units.

== 1955 ==
1955
On its 205th flight, the first prototype Cessna XT-37-CE, 54–716, c/n 40001, first flown 12 October 1954, becomes uncontrollable during spin tests and crashes in Kansas, Cessna test pilot Robert S. "Bob" Hagan ejecting successfully.

5 January
Two Boeing B-47E Stratojets of the 44th Bomb Wing from Lake Charles AFB, Louisiana, collide over the Gulf of Mexico during refuelling Wednesday night, causing one to crash and the other to limp home to base with damage, sans its observer who bailed out over the Gulf. Air-sea rescue teams began a search of the Gulf in an area some 30 miles (48 km) SE of Cameron, Louisiana, on the Gulf coast. B-47E-5-DT, 52-029, is lost with all three crew. The observer who bailed out was also never found. The pilot of the recovered bomber stated that the lost plane apparently smashed down on his aircraft from above, "leaving wheel tracks on the cabin before it spun off to crash in Gulf waters. Capt. Morris E. Shiver, 29, of Albany, Ga., said, 'We never knew what hit us,' as the two six-jet bombers crashed together Wednesday night about 30 miles (48 km) southeast of Cameron, La. An armada of planes and ships searched Thursday for the four airmen missing after the crash. Three of them were aboard the B-47 which plunged into the Gulf, while the fourth, 1st Lt. Matthew Gemery, of Lakewood, Ohio, an observer, could have returned on his limping plane had he waited another minute before ejecting himself. They identified Maj. Sterling T. Carroll, 33, of Port Arthur, Tex., as the commander of the plane that returned, and Shiver as the pilot. The other three missing airmen were Maj. Jean S. Pierson, of Danville, Ind., aircraft commander; Capt. David O. Crump, of Albemarle, N.C. [sic], copilot, and father of six children, and 1st Lt. Rodney P. Egelston of Levelland, Tex., observer-bombardier."

6 January
"BRAMAN, Okla. (AP) – A crippled B47 six-engine jet bomber barrel-rolled, crashed and exploded in a wheat field a mile east of here Thursday, killing all three crewmen aboard. The plane, from McConnell Air Force Base, Wichita, Kan., disintegrated into hundreds of pieces after the explosion in this farm area of North Central Oklahoma near the Kansas border. Maj. Lawrence Tacker of McConnell AFB identified the dead as: Capt. Wayne E. Andrew of Yellow Springs, Ohio, commander of the plane; 1st Lt. Joseph C. Cook, co-pilot, Sunland, Calif.; Capt. William C. Berry, observer, Dayton, Ohio. The wives and families of the men are living temporarily in Wichita. O. O. McMasters, who lives here, said he heard the plane coming from the north and in distress. McMasters said it suddenly barrel-rolled and crashed. A crater 10 to 12 feet (3.0 to 3.7 m) deep was left in the pasture. Bits of the crewmen's bodies and the plane were scattered for hundreds of yards. The plane landed on the Horne farm and the explosion was so great it rocked Bramen a mile away." B-47B-30-BW Stratojet, 51-2086, of the 3520th Flying Training Wing lost.

6 January
A ferry pilot in a flight of three North American F-51 Mustangs from Norton Air Force Base, California, to McClellan Air Force Base, California, bails out into the Sierra Pelona Mountains north of Los Angeles in the first snowstorm of the season after suffering engine failure. Capt. John S. Thompson, of the 1736th Ferrying Squadron at Long Beach Air Force Base, "trudged through the season's first heavy snow to a cafe at Acton in the mountains between Los Angeles' San Fernando Valley and the Mojave Desert and called authorities. He said he had landed not far from where his F51 Mustang, crippled by a faulty propeller, crashed in the snow." The airframe came down near the Southern Pacific Railroad tracks, east of Soledad Canyon Road. F-51H-10-NA Mustang, 44-64638, wrecked.

6 January
The crash of a Lockheed T-33A Shooting Star in the Shadow Mountains in the Mojave Desert, while en route from Perrin Air Force Base, Texas, to George Air Force Base, California, kills two crew just 18 miles (29 km) short of their destination. "The plane crashed as the pilot lost radio contact with George AFB, Victorville, in a heavy snowstorm while approaching from Williams AFB, Phoenix, Thursday. A George helicopter sighted the wreckage on the east side of snow-covered Shadow Mountain, 18 miles northwest of Victorville, and a search party reached the plane later Friday. The Perrin trainer was on a routine flight. It had stopped at Williams to refuel." Perrin officials identified the dead as Capt. Donald McLaren, 30, and 2d Lt. Richard Delehanty, 24, both of Sherman, Texas. Ground parties had set out from March Air Force Base, Riverside, on Thursday to search for the plane and its crew as bad weather delayed an air search. Shadow Mountain, an isolated peak, is located about 6 miles (9.7 km) due east of the main chain of the range. It has a peak elevation of 1,279 meters (4,196 ft). T-33A-1-LO, 51-9115, was involved.

6 January
"Tokyo (AP) – Two planes, presumably U. S. jets, collided high over Tokyo Bay Friday night in a blinding flash of light that startled thousands of residents. U. S. Far East Air Force headquarters said a Sabre jet fighter and a jet trainer from nearby Yokota Air Base were missing." "Tokyo (AP) – The U.S. Air Force today released the names of three Air Force pilots killed Thursday night when two jet planes collided over Tokyo Bay. The pilots were identified as 2nd Lt. Kenneth E. Heeter, son of Mr. and Mrs. Floyd E. Heeter of Emlenton, PA.; 2nd Lt. William O. Edwards, son of Mrs. E.D. Edwards of Beaucoup, Ill., and Capt. Milan Mosny, son of John Mosny, Little Falls, NY. Heeter was piloting an F86 Sabre jet and Edwards and Mosny were in a T33 trainer when their planes collided during a night training mission. After the collision the planes plummeted into Tokyo Bay. Two of the bodies have been recovered and search is continuing for the third. The Air Force did not say which bodies have been recovered. F-86D-45-NA Sabre, 52-3983, and T-33A-1-LO Shooting Star, 52-9749, were involved.

7 January
A pilot suffered first and second degree burns when his North American F-86D Sabre crashed on takeoff from Norton AFB, California, when the engine flamed out as he departed the runway at 16:19. 1st Lt. Robert L. Buss, from Selfridge AFB, Mount Clemens, Michigan, reached an altitude of c. 400 feet (120 m) after leaving the west end of the east-west runway and a speed of c. 160 knots (300 km/h; 180 mph) when the engine failed. It crashed about 400 yards (370 m) from the air strip 140 feet (43 m) west of Alabama Street and south of 3rd Street, near the Santa Ana River Wash. The plane was headed for Alabama Street, which was carrying heavy north-south traffic. "Officials at Norton praised the young pilot for his courage in making a 45-degree right turn with the dead plane to avoid crashing on the thoroughfare. Lt. Buss said he first struck a small embankment causing the fuel tank to explode before the plane began grinding to a halt 200 yards away. One wing was ripped from the craft on impact. The pilot's clothing caught fire when the fuel tank exploded. After crawling from the blazing craft he tore off his outer garments and rolled in the sand, saving his own life." Floyd K. Smith, chief of Office for Information Services at the San Bernardino installation, said that the pilot, rushed immediately to the base hospital, was from the 13th Fighter-Interceptor Squadron at Selfridge AFB. He is single and believed a resident of that base. Smith stated that Buss was on his way to the Fresno Air Terminal and had stopped for fuel at Norton earlier in the day. F-86D-40-NA, 52- 3794, was involved.

9 January
A U.S. Navy Beechcraft JRB-4 with three aboard goes missing while on a flight from Monterey, California, to Norton AFB, California. On board were LT Marshall Hand, of La Mesa Village, Monterey, pilot; LT Lasley K. Lacewell Jr., of Carmel, California copilot; and a sailor passenger, Haskel Lewis Reichbach, fireman of the USS Badoeng Strait (CVE-116), berthed in San Diego. Still missing by mid-week, despite the search efforts of the Air Force, Navy, Coast Guard, Civil Air Patrol and Army National Guard, "At dawn Thursday, 51 military planes coordinated by the 42nd Air Rescue Squadron at March Air Force Base will continue the search." Wreckage discovered near Corona in Silverado Canyon Wednesday turned out to be from another accident several years ago. According to CAA officials at Ontario International Airport who were the last to hear from the missing craft, the plane is believed to be down somewhere in the snow-covered San Bernardino Mountains. The SNB-2 Navigator, BuNo 67260, crashed into a ridge on Cajon Mountain above Cajon Pass in a rugged area of chaparral. All on board killed. The crash site was discovered on 13 January at about the 5,000-foot (1,500 m) level of Cajon Mountain.

13 January
Former Navy pilot, now a test pilot for Douglas Aircraft Company, James B. Verdin, 36, is killed this date when he bails out of A4D Skyhawk, BuNo 137815, at 30,000 feet (9,100 m) during a test flight near Victorville, California, and his parachute fails to open. Douglas company officials said that he radioed that he was bailing out shortly before the fighter-bomber crashed and burned. The wreckage was sighted at dusk 25 miles (40 km) northwest of Victorville between Haystack Butte and Highway 395 by helicopters from Edwards AFB. Verdin's body was not in the wreckage. The Los Angeles Sheriff's Office said a parachute was reported in the northeast section of the county shortly after the crash. Search parties were dispatched to the area, which is partially snow-covered. Temperatures were near freezing. The pilot's body was spotted at 15:00 Friday 14 January, on the desert floor eleven miles (18 km) south of Kramer Junction, about a mile east of Highway 395. It was found c. three miles (5 km) northeast of the aircraft wreckage by a ground party composed of personnel from Camp Irwin, Edwards AFB and George AFB. "Aiding in the widespread search by several thousand men afoot, on horseback and automobile was a posse from the San Bernardino County sheriff's office under the direction of Capt. Jack Miller of the Victorville substation." Scores of military and civilian planes were also involved. Confirmation that it was Verdin's body was made by Edwards AFB officers who landed at the scene in a helicopter a few minutes after the discovery. Verdin's helmet and part of his canopy were found about a mile south of where his body fell. Coroner R. E. Williams said that the body was removed from the scene by Air Force personnel. YA4D-1 Skyhawk, BuNo 137815, the third pre-production airframe, written off. Verdin, as a Navy lieutenant commander, had set an absolute speed record of 752.9 miles per hour (1,211.7 km/h) on a three-kilometer course over the Salton Sea in an F4D Skyray on 5 October 1953. He left the service in June 1954 to take a test pilot job with Douglas.

15 January
The U.S. Air Force grounds its Fairchild C-119 Flying Boxcars for a fleetwide engine inspection after incidents and accidents led to four forced or crashed landings within a week. A total of 145 paratroopers and air force crew were involved in the four accidents in which two men were killed. "Thirty-five airborne infantrymen and three crewmen parachuted to safety when an engine burst into flames Tuesday shortly after a C-119 took off from Sewart Air Force Base, Tenn. The pilot and co-pilot were killed in that crash. Just hours before the Tennessee crash, 33 paratroopers bailed out when an engine caught fire on their plane near Miles City, Montana. Pilot – Capt. T. G. Johnson, of Sewart AFB then guided the plane to the Miles City Airport without incident. Thirty-three paratroopers jumped to safety over Fairbanks, Alaska, Thursday when one engine of their plane failed. Lt. Robert Bruckner, pilot; Lt. Herbert T. Kurse, co-pilot, and six crewmen rode the plane to safety at Ladd AFB. Another C-119 engine failed Saturday shortly after the twin-engined Flying Boxcar took off from Ellsworth AFB, South Dakota, but the pilot safely landed the plane, which was carrying 33 paratroopers and three other crew members." Officers at Anchorage said that "Exercise Snowbird" schedules on troop and other aircraft movement would not be affected by the inspection, which is relatively simple. Sixty C-119s involved in the exercise arrived at Elmendorf AFB, Alaska, from Sewart AFB, and 16 more were en route. Officers said that engine inspections were being performed at stations along the way as well as at Anchorage. The airframe lost in the fatal Sewart AFB incident was C-119G, 52-5949, c/n 11136, which crashed five miles northeast of the base.

16 January
"EL TORO (AP) – A 30-year-old Long Beach policeman, on weekend flying duties with the Navy, was killed Sunday when his prop-driven fighter plane crashed in a muddy field near here. The Los Alamitos Naval Air Station identified the pilot as LTJG Robert Everett Hagen, 5039 Rose Avenue, Long Beach. Hagen, who flew one weekend a month in a reserve squadron, had just taken off on a routine training flight in the Vought-Corsair plane. He leaves his wife, Betty, and four daughters; Mary Lou, 12, Patricia Ann, 6, and twins Jennifer Joan and Jane Margaret, 8."

17 January
U.S. Navy Lockheed C-121J Super Constellation, BuNo 131639, c/n 4140, departs Harmon AFB, Newfoundland, at 04:22 for a "routine transport flight" to its home-station, NAS Patuxent River, Maryland. At 0500, while over Prince Edward Island, two engines fail. The flight attempts to return to Harmon and a Boeing B-29 is dispatched to escort the crippled C-121, rendezvousing with it at 0504 over Cabot Strait, between Newfoundland and Cape Breton Island, Nova Scotia. Twelve minutes later, the Constellation shut off its lights and other electrical equipment to facilitate the dumping of excess fuel. Within minutes the bomber lost radar contact with the transport and it vanished. The Constellation went into a stormy sea amidst clouds and fog. The B-29 circled the area and finally spotted five life rafts and life jackets amidst wreckage at 06:45, but no survivors. The six crew and seven passengers, twelve men and one woman, were lost. The plane's pilot was identified as LCDR L. R. Fullmer Jr., of Little Rock, Arkansas. The woman aboard was identified as Seaman Jeanette W. Elmer, 22, of Syracuse, New York.

19 January
"OXNARD (AP) – An Air Force T33 jet trainer made a successful forced landing in soft mud after its engine quit at 8,000 feet (2,400 m). Marine Maj. Edward LeFaivre, 33, Baltimore, Md., on temporary duty at Oxnard AFB, and Lt. Stanley Green, 23, Inglewood, were in the plane. Neither was injured, the Air Force said. The landing was made in a field about three miles (5 km) south of the base." T-33A-1-LO, 52-9760, was repaired and placed back in service, finally being retired to MASDC on 1 February 1985.

19 January
"TRIPOLI, Libya (AP) – Lt. Stanford Nall, 28, of Meridian, Calif., was killed Wednesday when his F86F Sabre jet crashed into the Mediterranean eight miles northwest of Wheelus Field, the U.S. Air Force said Friday."

19 January
"HONOLULU (AP) – The Navy said Friday night the transport Fred C. Ainsworth rescued all seven survivors of a twin-engined Navy amphibian forced down Wednesday night in the Central Pacific. The transport radioed that it had picked up the men at 06:50 (08:50 PST), the Hawaiian Sea Frontier said. Only a few hours before the rescue, the seven airmen had transferred from their life raft to a 33-foot lifeboat dropped by an air force plane. The lifeboat was about 665 miles northwest of Kwajalein, destination of the plane which developed engine trouble while flying from Johnston Island. The survivors reported by a walkie-talkie dropped to them that there were no casualties but some fever had developed. Coast Guard LT Martin W. Flesh was commander of the search plane which sighted the survivors. In Washington, the Navy identified the seven as LT James Gotfray Measel, pilot, Norfolk, Va.; ENS Harrison Bernard Nordstrom, ENS Robert Nason Gardon, navigator, Watertown, Mass.; Aviation Electronics Technician 2nd Class Robert D. Frame, Memphis, Tenn.; Aviation Machinist's Mate 2nd Class Edward James Nowark, Buffalo, N. Y.; Aviation Machinist's Mate 1st Class William Clement Pavey, Warwick, R. I.; and Aviation Electronics Technician 2nd Class Jerome Joseph Warras, Detroit, Mich."

20 January
"SAN DIEGO (AP) – A Navy F9F2 Panther jet fighter crashed into a Navy Retraining Command prison area near here Thursday, killing the pilot. He was identified as LT Douglas Mosser, 31, of La Jolla, Calif. He is survived by his wife, Ann; a son, Bruce, 1; and his mother, Mrs. Anna S. Mosser, Chinook, Mont. Parts of the exploding craft struck a warehouse and set it afire. A wing was seen to fall from the plane as it came in for a landing at Miramar Naval Air Station, across U.S. Highway 395 across from the Retraining Command's Camp Elliott. It rolled over and struck between the warehouse and another building, about a mile from the Miramar runway. The Navy said none of its personnel, including the 900 Navy, Marine Corps and Coast Guard prisoners confined for various offenses, was in the immediate area of the crash."

22 January

Royal Canadian Air Force B-25 Mitchell light bomber from No. 418 (City of Edmonton) Squadron crashed 40 km southwest of Edmonton, Alberta. Killed in the crash were: Flying Officer Douglas Merrill Ward (Pilot), Flying Officer Richard Grant Officer (Squadron Engineering Officer), and Flying Officer John Kutyn (Navigator). It is believed the B-25 Mitchell (that was returning from a cross-country flight) developed mechanical trouble and tried to crash-land on the frozen North Saskatchewan River. Unfortunately, the plane clipped the elevated cable for the Holborn Ferry, flipped over, crashed, and burned. There were no survivors.

27 January
"STUTTGART, Germany (UP) – A crippled U. S. Army helicopter and a second helicopter racing to its rescue both crashed in flames Thursday night, killing all six aboard, the 7th Army announced Friday. German police said one of the helicopters developed trouble over an open field and cracked up in an emergency landing shortly before midnight. It burst into flames. A second helicopter on night maneuvers dropped down to rescue the three crewmen but also piled up and caught fire." These may have been either Bell H-13 Sioux or Sikorsky H-19 Chickasaws; Sikorsky H-34 Choctaws were not delivered to the Army until later in 1955.

28 January
"WARNER SPRINGS, Calif. (AP) – A Navy jet fighter crashed Friday four miles north of here, killing the pilot. A second Navy man was fatally injured in a helicopter accident at the crash scene. The pilot was ENS L. R. Nelson, 23, stationed at Miramar Naval Air Station at San Diego, 60 miles southeast of here. The second man was not immediately identified. He was an enlisted man stationed at a Navy fliers' mountain survival school near here. Nelson's F9F5 Panther jet hit the top of a knoll while making a low-level pass on routine maneuvers. The Navy said a Coast Guard helicopter called to the scene from San Diego began to roll down a slope on landing. Its tail rotor hit the ground and flew apart. A piece of the rotor struck the enlisted man."

22 February
Fifth of 13 North American X-10s, GM-19311, c/n 5, on X-10 flight number 13, out of Edwards AFB, California, has supersonic flight aborted when afterburners fail. Automated landing fails when chute deploys during radio controlled approach, causing the vehicle to plunge into the desert and be destroyed.

2 March
Two Panther F9F-5 jets were destroyed in a mid-air collision over a remote area of Southern California. The jets crashed near the ghost town of Ogilby, California while one of the airmen was joining a formation during a gunnery training mission. US Naval Reserve pilot LTJG William Edward Nichols was killed while US Marine Corps Captain J. C. Gardner, 33, of Waldorf, Maryland ejected and parachuted to safety. Nichols was attached to Fighter Squadron 93 at Moffett Field but was on temporary duty to El Centro Naval Auxiliary Air Station. Gardner was based out of the Marine Air Base at El Toro, California and attached to squadron VMAT-102. Nichols, 24, was the son of Mr. and Mrs. Barney Nichols of San Pablo, California.

9 March
William Edward McLaughlin crashed fighter jet while taking off an aircraft carrier off the coast of California.

11 March
Third of 13 North American X-10s, GM-19309, c/n 3, on X-10 flight number 14, out of Edwards AFB, California, first flight of refitted c/n 3, the static test article. Vehicle exploded on gear retraction two seconds after lift-off – it was found that the destruct package was wired to the gear circuit instead of the engine circuit.

22 March

A United States Navy Douglas R6D-1 Liftmaster, BuNo 131612, c/n 43715, of Air Transport Squadron 3 (VR-3), assigned to the Military Air Transport Service, hits a cliff on Pali Kea Peak in the Waianae Range on Oahu, 15 miles (24 km) northwest of Honolulu, Territory of Hawaii, United States, at 02:03, killing all 57 passengers and nine crew, making it the worst heavier-than-air disaster in U.S. naval aviation history.

14 April
The first significant Nike Ajax missile accident occurs at Fort George G. Meade, Maryland, on a rainy afternoon this date, when, at 12:35, Battery C, 36th AAA Missile Battalion, located south of Maryland 602 (now Route 198), was "practicing Nike procedures" when the rocket booster on an Ajax which was being elevated on its launcher suddenly ignites and the missile takes off. Crewman SFC Stanley C. Kozak, standing seven feet (2.1 m) away, is caught in the flareback from booster ignition and suffers minor burns. Initial reports stated that the missile exploded about three miles (5 km) away, "several thousand feet in the air." Later accounts state that the missile, which was not in the fully upright launch position when it unexpectedly left the rail, suffered structural damage as it took off, "coupled with rapid initial acceleration, rendered the missile aerodynamically unsound and led to the break up. The fact the crew had not removed the propulsion safety pin during the drill contributed to the failure of the sustainer motor to start. And, since the launch was unintended, the missile was not under radar control. Neither the missile nor the booster exploded in flight. The booster separated and fell onto Barber's Trailer Court more than a mile from the launch site. Fuel tank fragments fell on the Baltimore-Washington Expressway where the fuel and oxidizer caused a fire but little or no damage. The missile nose section was found 500 yards from the launcher with the guidance assembly still attached." The Army board of inquiry isolated the cause as an electrical short caused by rain water in the junction box on the outside rear of the launcher control trailer. This condition defeated the crew's pre-launch safety checks.

18 April
Second prototype Lockheed XF-104A Starfighter, 53-7787, c/n 083-0002, is lost when airframe sheds the bottom ejection seat hatch fairing during 20 mm gun firing causing an explosive decompression. Test pilot Herman R. "Fish" Salmon ejected as aircraft broke up, injured landing in rough country. Joe Baugher cites date of 14 April for this accident.

28 April
Ten crew are "killed while flying" (KWF) when a Boeing B-29A-40-BN, 44-61677, piloted by Victor C. Marston, of the 581st Air Resupply Group, 20th Air Force, on a routine low-level training mission, strikes a hill on the south end of Okinawa, three miles (5 km) from Naha Airport, as it gropes through overcast. This was the 581st's first major accident. Sp3C Lee L. Bean, Artillery, U.S. Army, on duty with the First Composite Service Unit, is awarded the Soldier's Medal for his attempts to rescue any survivors when he voluntarily enters the fiercely burning wreckage in which oxygen bottles are exploding and removes several victims with no regard for his own safety before abandoning his efforts when it becomes clear that there are none alive.

3 May
Four U.S. Army personnel are killed in a nighttime crash of a helicopter on main post at Fort Benning, Georgia. A Sikorsky H-19 Chickasaw crashed and burned in a heavily wooded area half a mile from a housing development while on a routine training flight at Fort Benning. Killed were: Capt. Earl J. Scott, pilot; Capt. Robert F. Carter, pilot; SFC. Herman W. Punke; and Sgt. Horace G. Connor.

5 May
A twin engine target tow plane, Douglas JD-1 Invader, the U.S. Navy variant of the Air Force B-26, crashes six miles south of the Jackson Creek Ranch in the Black Rock Desert. A McDonnell F2H Banshee cut the tow cable, the target plane went into a dive and crashed. One enlisted man bailed out and survived, three others killed. The Banshee returned to Fallon Naval Auxiliary Station with a gash in its wing.

8 May
An Ohio Air National Guard pilot, Maj. Charles C. Cook, 30, of Dayton, stays with his ship in order to give other crew a chance to bail out of their Douglas C-47A-10-DK, 42-108869, c/n 12538, when it developed engine trouble en route from Friendship Airport, south of Baltimore, Maryland, to Columbus. Of the 15 aboard, 11 elect to parachute. Three others stayed with the pilot or did not have time to jump, all of whom survived the crash landing with relatively minor or no injuries when the plane came down in the Belmont County Hills near St. Clairsville. One of the men who took to the chute was killed. He is identified as Sgt. Thurl Warren Starcher, 46, New Philadelphia. Five others were admitted to the Barnesville, Ohio, General Hospital; one with serious injuries. The plane was carrying 11 members of the all-Ohio National Guard rifle team on a return flight from Friendship Airport, Air National Guard officials said.

13 May
On seventh and final flight of Northrop N-69A test vehicle for the Northrop XSM-62 Snark, only two of which were successful, mission was cut short when the missile collided with its T-33A photo plane.

17 May
"PORTSMOUTH, England AP – A navy fighter plane crashed into the funnel of the 36,000-ton British aircraft carrier Eagle today during deck landing exercises in the English Channel. The pilot was seriously injured. The admiralty said the plane was given a signal to make another circuit as it came into land. The pilot increased speed but the engine stalled and the plane plowed into the rear of the funnel, burying the engine in the steam pipes." First cruise for full-scale training exercises without operational restrictions for the Westland Wyvern S Mk. 4, deployed aboard HMS Eagle with Nos. 813 and 827 Squadrons, begins inauspiciously when Wyvern, VZ785, '135/J', of 827 Naval Air Squadron, attempting a go-around after misjudged approach, strikes ship's funnel, forcing the carrier to return to Portsmouth to have Armstrong Siddeley Python turboprop engine extracted from funnel "in which it was stuck like a dart." Repairs delay cruise by a fortnight. An article published in the 1976 debut issue of Air Enthusiast Quarterly, by William Green and Gordon Swanborough, with Harald Penrose, incorrectly gives the accident date as 30 September 1955.

18 May
McDonnell Aircraft Corporation engineering test pilot Robert H. Strange is killed in the crash of an F3H-1N Demon naval fighter, BuNo 133495, after the J40 engine flamed out. He had just completed a dive from 40,000 feet (12,000 m), above Mach, to test dynamic pressure in the radar compartment under these conditions. The engine died above 25,000 feet (7,600 m). The pilot tried repeated restarts with no luck until he had descended to 5,000 feet (1,500 m), at which point he radioed that he was abandoning the plane and attempted to eject. The McDonnell-designed seat failed and Strange was killed as the jet impacted a cornfield near Carrollton, Illinois, about 55 miles northeast of St. Louis, barely missing a farm home "as it plowed a 15-foot furrow in the earth. Strange's body was about 100 feet (30 m) from the wreckage." Strange was born in Sumter, South Carolina, in 1922. He joined the U.S. Navy as an aviation cadet in June 1942, and ended up flying with Marine air, 1943–1946. He was awarded the Air Medal, with two gold stars, and the Distinguished Flying Cross. He graduated from Clemson Agricultural College of South Carolina with a degree in mechanical engineering in 1948, and did engineering work for Curtiss-Wright and Frigidaire for three years. He then served with the Marines again from 1951 to 1953. Strange joined the McDonnell Corporation as a design engineer in November 1953, becoming a test pilot in October 1954. He is survived by his wife Shirley, and four children, David, Douglas, Susan and Jeffrey.

25 May
Convair B-36J-5-CF Peacemaker, 52-2818A, c/n 374, of the 6th Bomb Wing, call sign Abbott 27, on a routine training flight, crashes at c. 23:05. CST, in the southwest corner of Glasscock County, Texas, on the Drannon Ranch, c. 18.5 miles (29.8 km) southwest of Sterling City, Texas. The aircraft had apparently disintegrated due to thunderstorm or tornadic activity, losing its outer wing panels and all tail control surfaces, and impacted in a flat attitude with little forward motion. Aircraft wreckage was found in a 25 x 3-mile (4.8 km) path on a heading of 66 degrees true. None of the 15 members of crew L-22 were able to escape the damaged bomber and all hatches and ports were found still in place. The wings and forward fuselage burned on impact, with only the rear fuselage remaining. The aircraft had been preparing to land at Walker AFB, New Mexico, when it was lost. Due to the extended period that the crash site was kept secured while crew remains were recovered and identified, and wreckage from the disintegration was searched for (almost a week), there was some question as to whether the B-36 was armed with a nuclear weapon, but there is no evidence to support this.

27 May
A Boeing B-47E-10-DT Stratojet, 52-054, returning from a night navigation training mission after slightly more than two hours aloft crashes on the runway at Lincoln AFB, Nebraska, at 02:54 while landing. Brake parachute failed and it overran the runway – no injuries. Joe Baugher cites date of 24 May. John Kodsi, aircraft commander, and Sgt. Edward Seagraves, plus two other crew survive.

3 June
The General de Brigada Aérea (Chief of Staff) of the Fuerza Aérea Boliviana, Mayor Jorge Jordán Mercado, is killed when his aircraft crashes in Tapacari in eastern Bolivia. An air force sergeant also dies in the accident. The two-sentence Associated Press item announcing Mercado's death, widely printed, does not identify the type of aircraft involved. The major was one of the first graduates of the Escuela Militar de Aviación (EMA) (Military Aviation School), founded in 1916, and became its first commander in 1931. "He was a military aviator [of] outstanding performance. He commanded the Bolivian aviation as First Commander of the Air Force campaign during the Chaco War (1932–1935). The vast escalation during the Chaco War forced the school and most of the Bolivian air force to settle at Villamontes...". "He participated in operations in support of Corrales and Toledo forts He received the Military Merit in the grade of "Comendador". He later served as Director of Aviation at the Ministry of Defence. He was member of the Supreme Court of Military Justice and Chief of Aviation until his death in the plane crash in the Quebrada of Patani, Cochabamba," this date. Grupo Aéreo de Caza 31 – "Gral. Jorge Jordán Mercado", Bolivian Aerial Fighter Group "31" (GAC-31) is named for the late officer.

4 June
A Royal Air Force Short Sunderland sank on landing off Eastbourne, East Sussex with the loss of three of her thirteen crew. Survivors were rescued by RAF launches and the Eastbourne Lifeboat Beryl Tollemache.

22 June
While approaching USS Oriskany (CV-34) for a night landing in the Sea of Japan, U.S. naval aviator LT John R. C. Mitchell's McDonnell F2H Banshee begins to sink. Mitchell turns but fails to clear the ship and crashes into the ship's fantail. The rear half of the airplane falls into the ocean in flames, but Mitchell sustains only minor injuries. Five sailors sleeping on the fantail are injured. When Mitchell calls the ship's ready room to report his status, the officers to whom he speaks initially refuse to believe that he is still alive. The incident will be immortalized in The Right Stuff by Tom Wolfe, which refers to Mitchell by the alias of "accident-prone Mitch Johnson".

5 July
Sole prototype Supermarine Type 529, VX136, crashes while flying out of Boscombe Down, this date. Aircraft entered a spin at 10,000 ft which deteriorated into a flat spin from which the pilot, Lt. Cdr. Rickell, could not recover. Late ejection due to problems with jettisoning the canopy and operating the ejector seat – the seat did not have time to separate, nor did the parachute have time to fully deploy – Pilot killed on impact with the ground. The aircraft was completely destroyed.

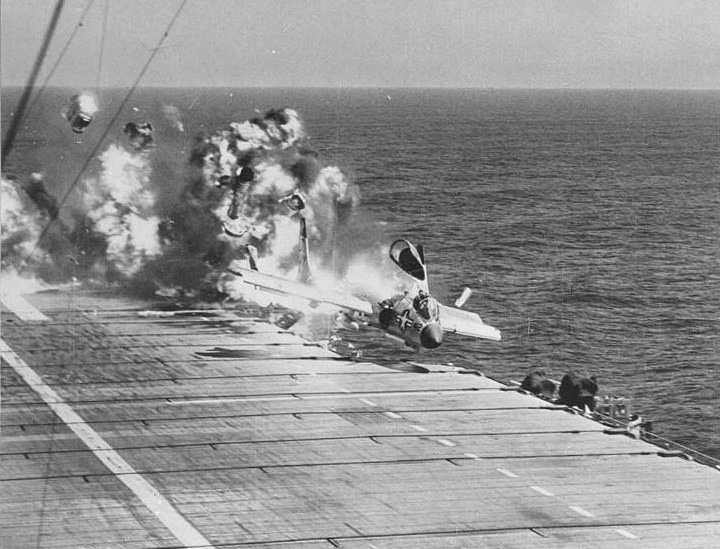
Ramp strike of a VF-124 F7U-3 on the USS Hancock on 14 July 1955 resulting in the deaths of the pilot, two boatswain's mates and a photographer's mate. LSO Ted Reilly manages to sprint across fantail and gets clear. Photo by PH2 James Binkley.

14 July
Vought F7U-3 Cutlass, BuNo 129595, 'D 412', of VF-124, suffers ramp strike on landing aboard USS Hancock during carrier qualifications off the California coast, disintegrating airframe spins off portside; pilot LCDR Jay Alkire, USNR, executive officer of VF-124, killed when airframe sinks, still strapped into ejection seat; also killed are two boatswain's mates, one photographer's mate, in port catwalk by burning fuel. Dramatic footage shot from port catwalk exists showing burning fighter going over the side. Footage: https://www.youtube.com/watch?v=9CT670dAzfo

4 August
Avro Ashton WB492 is damaged beyond repair at RAF Pershore, Worcestershire, United Kingdom, when a fire in the undercarriage causes severe damage to a main spar in one of the wings. The aircraft is Struck Off Charge on 30 November.

8 August
Internal explosion aboard Bell X-1A, 48-1384, while being carried aloft by Boeing B-29 mothership, forces NACA pilot Joseph Albert Walker to exit aircraft back into the Superfortress, which is then jettisoned due to the full fuel load it carries, the rocket-powered test craft coming down on the Edwards AFB, California bombing range.

11 August

Two United States Air Force Fairchild C-119 Flying Boxcar transports of the 10th Troop Carrier Squadron, 60th Troop Carrier Group, collide over Edelweiler, Germany, near Stuttgart, shortly after takeoff for training mission from Stuttgart Army Airfield near Echterdingen. C-119G, 53-3222, c/n 11238, piloted by Robert T. Asher, and C-119G, 53-7841, c/n 11258, piloted by Eugene L. Pesci, both crash. In all, 66 died, 47 on one Fairchild C-119 Flying Boxcar, and 19 on the other. Troops aboard were of the Army's 499th Engineering Battalion.

19 August
Sixth of 13 North American X-10s, GM-19312, c/n 6, on Navaho X-10 flight number 16, out of Edwards AFB, California, demonstrates planned automated landing on first AFMTC flight, but drag chute does not deploy after landing. The vehicle overruns the skid strip, the nosewheel collapses in the sand in the overrun, the tanks rupture, and the vehicle burns.

20 August

"A single-engined Cessna monoplane, flying on a Civil Air Patrol mission, crashed and burned Saturday at 5 p.m. in the front yard of a home in the Rolling Hills section of Palos Verdes Peninsula.

In"extremely critical" condition at Harbor General Hospital is Mrs. Myrtle Beryl Kirby, 35, of 5420 Linda Dr., Torrance.

She was riding with the owner and pilot, Maj. Davis C. Cochran, 37-year-old World War II vet, of 268 Calle de Andalusia, Torrance. Maj. Cochran is at the same hospital in serious condition.

The plane was on an official Air Force approved mission for CAP Squadron 43 at Torrance Municipal Airport.

Witnesses said the monoplane inexplicably lost altitude and its right wing struck a 35-foot metal flagpole in front of a county fire station at Crest and Quail Ridge Rds.

THE AIRCRAFT SPUN completely around and crashed on a slope in the front yard of Mr. and Mrs. Carl Price, 1 Quail Ridge Rd.

The sound of the plane’s hitting the flagpole was heard by firemen in the station.

Fire Capt. James Harpel and Engineer Roy Pearson dashed to the plane and pulled the two occupants to safety just as the engine burst into flames.

CAP Sgt. William Blaine, 19, of 26007 Lucille Ave., Lomita, told authorities that the plane had just dropped a message to his ground crew.

Then, he said, the plane climbed, then lost altitude rapidly before “disappearing from view.”

MAJ. COCHRAN is the commanding officer of CAP Group 7, with headquarters at Long Beach. Mrs. Kirby is second lieutenant attached to the communications section of the group. Her husband, John, is the squadron’s air inspector.

Mrs. Kirby suffered second- and third-degree burns over most of her body. Maj. Cochran sustained second-degree burns, possible internal injuries and cuts and bruises.

[Myrtle Beryl Kirby died after 83 percent of her skin burnt] Source: Historical Newspaper Article Cutout

25 August
Vought F7U-3 Cutlass, BuNo 129585, of VF-124, suffers collapsed starboard main landing gear during a hard landing aboard USS Hancock while she was operating in the vicinity of Hawaii.

30 August
Vought F7U-3 Cutlass, BuNo 129592, of VF-124, misses all the wires during a landing aboard USS Hancock, operating off of Hawaii, and hits the barrier. "Although reported to have suffered only slight damage, it was struck off charge and never flew again."

8 September
Boeing B-29A, 44-62264, from Kadena AB, Okinawa, Japan crashed into the water approximately 275 miles south-west of Okinawa after eight hours of flying on a routine low-level round robin training flight from Kadena, AB. Rescuers found an oil slick in the water along with life rafts and equipment from the aircraft, but unfortunately, they found no survivors or remains. Lost in the crash were: Pilots 1st Lt Wendell Von Bobber, Capt Walter Prolisco, and Maj Hubert Karcher, AOB 1st Lt Frank Mills, Navigators 2d Lt Robert George and Capt Richard Jones, VO 1st Lt Joseph Jelinek, FE's Maj Robert McConnell and TSgt LeRoy Nelson, Radio Operators SSgt Harold Matheis and A1C Bernard Hurteau, and Aerial Gunners A1C Maurice O'Shea and SSgt Thomas Steele. The cause of the crash remains unknown.

9 September
Douglas B-66 Destroyer, from Hurlburt Field crashed near Alvin, Texas. Three crew members aboard the plane bailed out after their plane developed trouble at 37,000 feet (11,000 m). Capt. Arthur J. Manzo, radar observer-navigator, was critically injured and died of his injuries 11 September 1957. Other crew members included 1st Lt. David E. Moore, pilot, and S/Sgt. Robert J. Newland, gunner.

13 September
Six people were killed when a North American B-25 suffered engine failure on takeoff from Mitchel AFB, New York, and crashed into Greenfield Cemetery, Hempstead, New York, five minutes after departure. Three of the victims were crew members, and three were passengers. The names of the dead were withheld pending notification of next of kin. B-25J-35/37-NC, 45-8822, modified to TB-25N, then to VB-25N, was piloted by James D. Judy.

14 September
USAF Douglas A-26B-45-DL Invader, 44-34126, loses starboard engine on take off from 5,142-foot-long runway 12/30, Mitchel AFB, New York, runs through perimeter fence on southeast side of field, comes to rest on the Hempstead Turnpike. Port undercarriage leg collapses, port prop blades bent. No injuries. Another source identifies this airframe as A-26B-66-DL, 44-34626, and the pilot as John E. Mervyn.

6 October
McDonnell Aircraft company test pilot George Shirley Mills bails out of McDonnell F3H-2N Demon, BuNo 133549, over Carrollton, Illinois near St. Louis, Missouri after what appears to be a massive systems failure, including the J40 engine. Instead of crashing, fighter circles over two states for more than an hour sans canopy, ejection seat and pilot. It eventually impacts in cornfield near Monticello, Iowa, 250 miles (400 km) from ejection. Mills will pass away on 25 May 2007. The whole J40 project, upon which Westinghouse had staked their engine division's future, suffered developmental delays and never lived up to the performance expectations anticipated, and the engine was considered unusable due to reliability problems, especially in the development of a functional afterburner. The J40 project was cancelled entirely in 1955, and aircraft designed to use it were either cancelled outright, like the Grumman XF10F Jaguar, downgraded in performance expectations like the F3H Demon (six airframes and four pilots lost out of the initial production run), with Time Magazine calling the Navy's grounding of all Westinghouse-powered F3H-1 Demons a "fiasco", with 21 unflyable planes that could be used only for Navy ground training at a loss of $200 million. The A3D Skywarrior and F4D Skyray had been designed to permit replacement powerplants of a larger diameter and length and were subsequently fitted with the Pratt & Whitney J57 in lieu of the troubled J40, but the F3H required an enlarged fuselage and revised wing to accommodate an Allison J71, the only viable substitute, but even this combination was underpowered. The Westinghouse Aviation Gas Turbine Division would shut down shortly thereafter.

13 October
A Boeing B-47B-40-BW Stratojet, 51-2231, of the 320th Bombardment Wing, crashes while taking off from March Air Force Base, California, coming down in what is now the Sycamore Canyon Wilderness Park, northwest of the base. Capt. Edward Anthony O'Brien Jr., pilot, Capt. David James Clare, co-pilot, Major Thomas Francis Mulligan, navigator, and Capt. Joseph M. Graeber, chaplain, are all killed. Crew chief Albert Meyer, of Westchester, California, was not flying with his aircraft that day because he had already exceeded his flight hours. In the accident report, Col. Frederic Huish, investigation board president, concluded the primary cause of the accident was unknown, due to lack of positive evidence.

14 October
A Strategic Air Command Boeing B-47E-90-BW Stratojet, 52–500, crashes while attempting landing on 3,400-foot (1,000 m) runway 27 at NAS Atlanta, Georgia, shearing off tail and coming to rest beside runway. This facility is now DeKalb-Peachtree Airport.

15 October
A Lockheed T-33A-1-LO Shooting Star trainer, 51-9227, crashes into Santa Monica Bay. Pilot Richard Martin Theiler, 28, and co-pilot Paul Dale Smith departed Los Angeles International Airport at 0215 PST aboard the T-33A, bound for Yuma, Arizona. This was an IFR departure, with instructions to report 2,000 feet (610 m) on top of overcast. The Los Angeles weather at the time was 1,200 feet (370 m) overcast, 4 miles (6.4 km) visibility, in haze and smoke. After they were given clearance for takeoff they were never seen nor heard from again. Plane was found in 2009 by aviation archaeologist G. Pat Macha and a group of volunteers, in 100 feet (30 m) of water.

24 October
Eleventh of 13 North American X-10s, GM-52-4, c/n 11, on Navaho X-10 flight number 17, out of Cape Canaveral, Florida, an engine problem results in a mission abort. After autolanding the nose wheel develops a shimmy, the vehicle runs off the skid strip, catches fire, and is destroyed.

25 October
Boeing WB-29A-35-BN Superfortress, 44-61600, c/n 11077, of the 53rd Weather Reconnaissance Squadron, out of RAF Burtonwood, experiences multiple problems including failed fuel feed pump, head winds, while returning from "Falcon" mission to polar region; pilot orders bail out of crew shortly before midnight as fuel exhaustion becomes critical, all eleven survive, with only one minor injury. Aircraft comes down near Kirkby Lonsdale, Lancashire, England, burns, only rear fuselage and tail remaining intact.

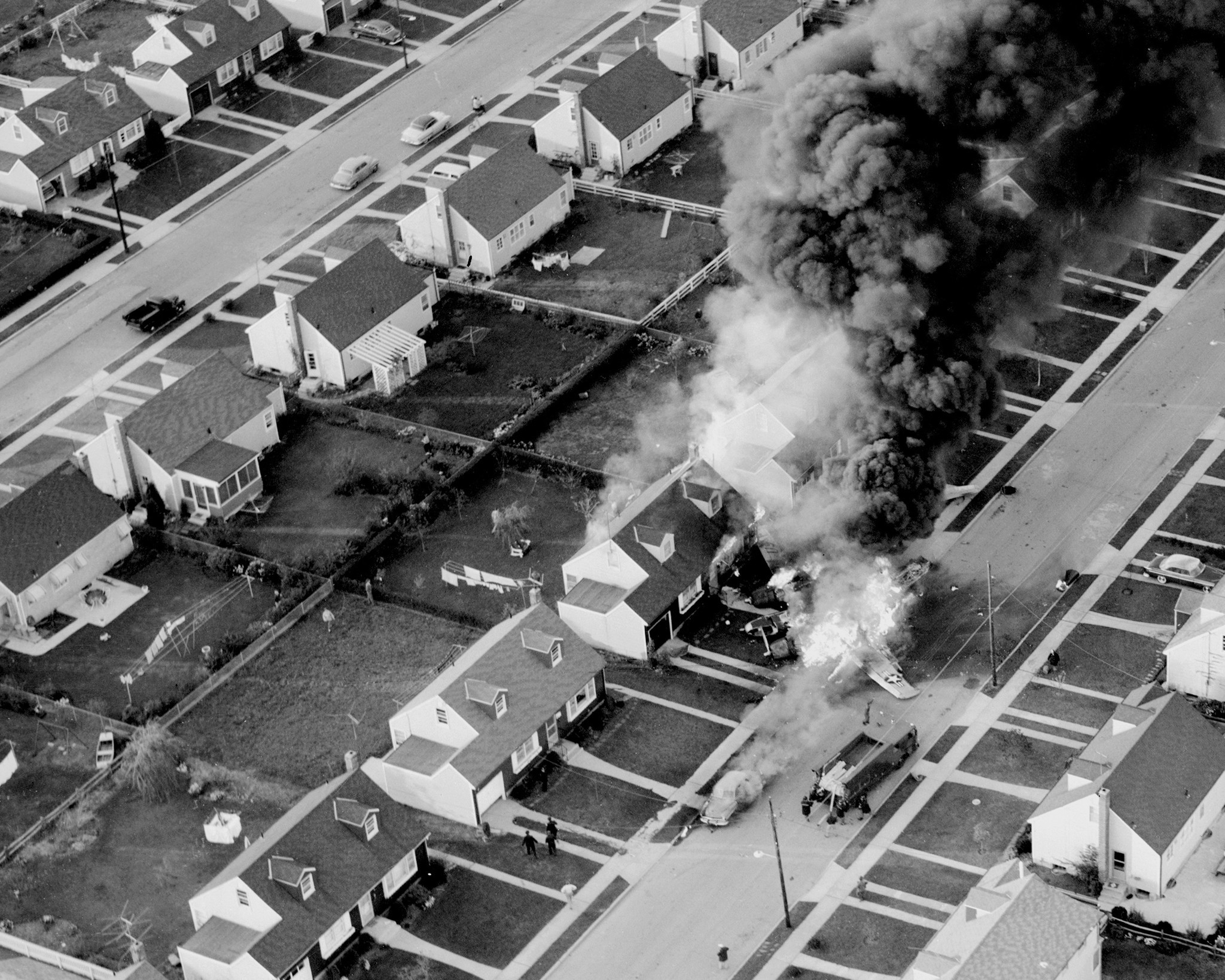
"Bomber Crashes in Street"

2 November
Air Force Douglas B-26C-45-DT Invader, 44-35737, crashed into houses on Barbara Drive in East Meadow, Long Island, New York. An aerial photograph of the crash scene, "Bomber Crashes in Street", by George Mattson, of the New York Daily News, earned him, and 25 of his newspaper colleagues, the 1956 Pulitzer Prize Photography Award. KWF are Captain Clayton Elwood and Sergeant Charles Slater.

4 November
While operating in the Pacific with the 7th Fleet, USS Hancock flies aboard Vought F7U-3 Cutlass, BuNo 129586, 'D', of VF-124, but tailhook floats over all wires, jet hits barrier, and ejection seat is jarred into firing when nose gear collapses. Pilot LTJG George Barrett Milliard, in his seat, is thrown 200 feet (61 m) down the deck and suffers fatal injuries when he strikes the tail of an AD Skyraider. Airframe written off.

17 November
Douglas MC-54M Skymaster, 44-9068A, c/n 27294/DO240, tail number O-49068, built as a C-54E-5-DO and later converted to an MC-54M, attached to the 57th Air Transport Squadron, 1700th Air Transport Group, of the Military Air Transport Service, at Kelly AFB, Texas, piloted by 1st Lt. George Manuel Pappas Jr., 27, and co-piloted by 2d Lt. Paul E. Winham, 24, crashes into Mount Charleston, c. 20 miles (32 km) WNW of Las Vegas, Nevada, at c. 08:19, while on a routine flight with technical personnel from the Lockheed "Skunk Works" at Burbank, California, where it had picked up passengers after departing Norton Air Force Base, California. Aboard were a mixture of military staffers and civilian subcontractors, engineers and technicians. It was en route to Groom Lake, Nevada, the secret Area 51, when it was blown off course by a severe storm, killing all 14 on board, nine civilians and five military. A 60-knot (110 km/h; 69 mph) crosswind had pushed the C-54 into a canyon towards the mountain. The aircraft was climbing, using rated military power, with 10–15 degrees of flaps to get on top of the overcast, when it impacted, skipped about 60 feet (18 m), and slid another 20 feet (6.1 m) before partially burning, coming to rest almost at the crest of the ridge. Because of the secrecy involved with the Lockheed U-2 project, the C-54 crew was never in contact with Air Traffic Control, and, off course and lost in clouds, an error in plotting the position of the Skymaster in relation to the Spring Mountains range resulted in the crash only 50 feet (15 m) below the crest of an 11,300-foot ridge leading to the peak of Mount Charleston. Military guards prevented newsmen from approaching the crash area, and a cover story was issued that this was a business flight to the Atomic Energy Commission's Nevada Test Site. Lockheed subsequently assumes responsibility for the flights to "Watertown", using a company-owned C-47. Pappas had logged 1,383 hours flying C-54s, and co-pilot Paul Winham, 682 hours. Pappas was posthumously promoted to the grade of Captain, USAF, effective 15 September 1955, as announced in Department of the Air Force Letter Orders dated 2 December 1955. Also KWF were Flight Engineer Tech S/Sgt. Clayton D. Farris, 26; and Flight Attendant Guy R. Fasolas, and ten others: S/Sgt. John Hamilton Gaines, USAF, 1007th Air Intelligence Service Group, 23; Harold Silent, 59, of the Hycon Manufacturing Company that produced the U-2 camera; Fred Hanks, USAF, 35, of Hycon Mfg. Co.; Rodney Kreimendahl, 38, Lockheed Company; Richard Hruda, 37, Lockheed; James Francis Bray, 48, of the Central Intelligence Agency; Terence O’Donnell, 22, CIA Security Officer; James William Brown, 23, CIA Security Officer; Edwin Urolatis, 27, CIA Security Officer; and William Henderson "Bill" Marr, 37, CIA Security Officer.

17 November
One of the pilots of two USMC Grumman F9F Panther fighters (of VMA-323 ?) that collided over the Mojave Desert near Lancaster, California, was killed this date. The dead pilot was identified as Lt. Donald R. Roland, formerly of Itasca, Illinois. The pilot of the other plane, Lt. Robert F. Heinecken, of Riverside, California, made an emergency landing and was uninjured. The planes were from MCAS El Toro, California.

29 November
Royal Air Force Gloster Javelin FAW.1, XA561, on flight out of RAF Boscombe Down, entered spiral at 39,000 feet (12,000 m) from which the pilot could not recover. He ejected and the aircraft came down, largely intact, at Ashey, Isle of Wight.

30 November
B-47 crash occurred just after Thanksgiving 1956. Barksdale B-47 tail No. 52-3360 of the 301st Bomb Wing, commanded by Major Robert Slane, was deep into an ORI (operational readiness inspection) mission, flying over Canada and preparing to refuel, when the airplane experienced aileron power unit problems and went into an uncontrollable spin. Slane ordered a bailout and survived, but the other crew members – pilot 2nd Lt. Richard J. Martin, copilot 2nd Lt. Donald S. Petty and observer 1st Lt. Max Workman – perished. The plane crashed near Seagull lake about 45 miles north of Port Arthur now Thunder Bay. Slane was recovering 19 further south at Ray Lake the morning after the crash.

December
Second Sud-Aviation, SNCASO SO.9050 Trident II -002, short-range interceptor, is destroyed on its first flight.

7 December
First prototype Martin XP6M-1 Seamaster, BuNo 138821, c/n XP-1, first flown July 14, 1955, disintegrates in flight at 5,000 feet (1,500 m) due to horizontal tail going to full up in control malfunction, subjecting airframe to 9 G stress as it began an outside loop, crashing into Potomac River near junction of St. Mary's River, killing four crew, pilot Navy Lieutenant Commander Utgoff, and Martin employees, Morris Bernhard, assistant pilot, Herbert Scudder, flight engineer, and H.B. Coulon, flight test engineer.

9 December
A USAF Republic F-84F-45-RE Thunderstreak, 52-6692, based at RAF Sculthorpe, suffers flame-out and after several failed attempts at a relight, the pilot, Lt. Roy G. Evans, 24, ejects at 3,500 feet (1,100 m). The fighter comes down on the Lodge Moor Infectious Diseases Hospital on the outskirts of Sheffield at 17:00, striking two wards, killing one patient, Mrs. Elsie Murdock, 46, of South Road, Sheffield, and injuring seven others. Fires are under control by 19:30.

15 December
An RAF Bristol Sycamore helicopter, XG501, crewed by Flight Sergeant P. A. Beart and Sergeant E. F. Hall, departed from RAF Leuchars, Scotland at 09:35 to perform a sea winching exercise at the Bell Rock lighthouse. At approximately 10:00, the helicopter's tail rotor struck the anemometer on the top of the lighthouse, and as a result, the aircraft crashed into the sea. The incident was witnessed by a second helicopter which immediately transmitted a distress call and flew to the scene of the crash. In response to the distress signal, four aircraft, a further two Sycamore helicopters, an RAF rescue launch and three lifeboats searched the area, recovering the body of XG501's navigator. The body of the pilot was not recovered. The lighthouse was damaged, including the loss of its light, but its keepers remained uninjured. Due to bad weather, the lighthouse could not be repaired until after 20 December, when conditions permitted delivery of supplies.

16 December
Republic YF-105A-1-RE Thunderchief, 54-0098, the first prototype, crash lands at Edwards AFB, California. Republic test pilot Russell M. "Rusty" Roth was forced to make an emergency landing after the right main landing gear had been torn away after having been inadvertently extended during high speed flight. Pilot uninjured. Although the airframe was returned to the factory, it was deemed too costly to repair.

== 1956 ==
5 January
Sole Piasecki YH-16A Turbo Transporter helicopter prototype, 50-1270, breaks up in flight at c. 15:55. and crashes near Swedesboro, New Jersey, near the Delaware River, while returning to Philadelphia, Pennsylvania, from a test flight over New Jersey. The cause of the crash was later determined to be the aft slip ring, which carried flight data from the instrumented rotor blades to the data recorders in the cabin. The slip ring bearings seized, and the resultant torque load severed the instrumentation standpipe inside the aft rotor shaft. A segment of this steel standpipe tilted over and came into contact with the interior of the aluminum rotor shaft, scribing a deepening groove into it. The rotor shaft eventually failed in flight, which in turn led to the aft blades and forward blades desynchronizing and colliding. The aircraft was a total loss; the two test pilots, Harold Peterson and George Callaghan, were killed. This led to the cancellation not only of the YH-16, but also the planned sixty-nine-passenger YH-16B version.

10 January
The most notorious incident of aircraft pitch-up known as the "Sabre dance" was the loss of brand new North American F-100C-20-NA Super Sabre, 54-1907, flown by Lt. Barty R. Brooks, a native of Martha, Oklahoma, and a Texas A&M graduate, of the 1708th Ferrying Wing, Detachment 12, Kelly AFB, Texas, during an attempted emergency landing at Edwards AFB, California, which was caught by film cameras set up for an unrelated test. The aircraft was one of three being delivered from North American's Palmdale plant to George AFB, California, but the nose gear pivot pin worked loose, allowing the wheel to swivel at random, so he diverted to Edwards which had a longer runway. The pilot fought to retain control as he rode the edge of the flight envelope, but fell off on one wing, hit the ground, and exploded with fatal results. These scenes were inserted in the movie The Hunters, starring Robert Mitchum and Robert Wagner. The incident was also commemorated in the fighter pilot song "Give Me Operations" (set to the tune of the California Gold Rush song "What Was Your Name in the States?"):

"Don't give me a One-Double-Oh
To fight against friendly or foe
That old Sabre Dance made me
crap in my pants
Don't give me a One-Double-Oh."

Reports that the pilot was asphyxiated by throwing up into his mask are untrue. His helmet and oxygen mask were not on his head when rescuers found him. Both were found in the wreckage. Lt. Brooks was interred in Round Grove Cemetery, Lewisville, Texas. Film of this accident has been used as a training aid by both the Air Force and the Navy. Footage: https://www.youtube.com/watch?v=mZL0x-gEDM8

20 January
Gloster Meteor NF 12 WS661 of the Royal Air Force clipped a tree and crashed into buildings at Wadhurst, East Sussex, United Kingdom. Both crew were killed, as were two people on the ground.

26 January
“ENID, Okla. (UP) – Three officers from Vance Air Force Base were killed Thursday when a B25 bomber disintegrated in air and crashed in a field southwest of here. The Air Force identified the victims as 1st Lt. Peter F. Schermerhorn, Piedmont, Calif., as instructor, and 2nd Lt. James Fuller Glass, Durham, N.C., and 2nd Lt. Donald Russell Zynda, Detroit, student pilots.”

27 January
“Tokyo (AP) – Five U.S. Sabre Jets crashed in the Far East Friday – four after they ran out of fuel near Okinawa and one in Japan. The pilots escaped unhurt. The loss, running to about two million dollars, was the costliest single day’s toll of Sabres in the Far East since the Korean War. An Air Force spokesman said four Sabres were returning to Okinawa from a brief training flight when they changed course to skirt bad weather and ran out of fuel. The fifth bounced into a field of radishes on takeoff and started to burn. The four F86Fs of the 44th Fighter-Bomber Squadron based at Kadena, Okinawa, were on a ‘routine training mission,’ the Air Force said. It said one pilot landed on Okinawa near Okuma and three others were rescued from the East China Sea, which is between Okinawa and Red China. The pilots were identified as Lt. George E. Tims, Wyandotte, Mich.; Lt. Walter H. Fears, Crewe, Va.; Lt. Leonard M. Weeks Jr., Milwaukee, Wis.; and Lt. John Bradick III, Flossmore, [sic] Ill.”

30 January
"PORTERVILLE (UP) – A Navy guided missile launched from the Mojave Desert in Southern California broke away from its guiding aircraft Monday and crashed into an orange grove 400 yards from a farm house near here. Fragments of the craft, which plowed a furrow 25 feet (7.6 m) long and 10 feet (3.0 m) deep through the grove, were scattered over a 100-yard area. There were no reports of injuries or property damage. A piloted control plane, probably a jet, was flying a ‘close wing position’ to the craft when it got away due to bad weather conditions encountered 'during a routine training mission or a test', the navy said. Navy spokesmen said the craft carried no explosives. They would not immediately release an exact description of the craft, saying it was classified information. But they said it was considered to be a radio-controlled ‘drone’ aircraft. Spokesmen said the pilot of the control craft ‘did all he could’ to control the drone before it crashed.”

31 January
USAF North American TB-25N Mitchell, 44-29125, "converted for passengers", on cross country flight from Nellis AFB, Nevada to Olmsted AFB, Pennsylvania, after departing Selfridge AFB, Michigan suffers fuel starvation northeast of Pittsburgh, Pennsylvania in mid-afternoon, attempts to divert to Greater Pittsburgh Airport, ditches in the Monongahela River at the 4.9-mile (7.9 km) marker, west of the Homestead High-Level Bridge, drifts c. 1.5 miles (2.4 km) downstream in 8–10 knots current, remaining afloat for 10–15 minutes. All six crew evacuate but two are lost in the 35 °F (2 °C) water before rescue. "Police, a heroic truck driver and rivermen combined to pull the four survivors from the stream, swollen by recent rains and melting snow. None of the survivors suffered serious injury. 'I felt like a block of ice when I was brought into shore,' said M.Sgt. Alfred J. Alleman, 36, of Las Vegas, Nev. 'I was hanging on a log with the others but it couldn't support all of us and I set out for shore because I guess I'm an above-average swimmer. I'm sure glad I was. That river was mighty chilly and the current (about 15 miles an hour) was strong.'" The other survivors were Maj. William L. Dotson, 33, pilot, of San Antonio, Texas, commander of the Nellis AFB Weather Office; Capt. John F. Hamieson, 32, Mechanicsburg, Pennsylvania; and Airman 2d Class Charles L. Smith, 18, Philadelphia. S.Sgt. Walter E. Soocey, 32, of Palmer, Alaska, was listed as missing, along with an unidentified passenger whose name was withheld pending notification of next of kin. Search for sunken bomber suspended 14 February with no success – aircraft is thought to have possibly settled in submerged gravel pit area in 32 feet (9.8 m) of water, c. 150 feet (46 m) from shore, possibly now covered by 10–15 feet (3.0–4.6 m) of silt. This crash, dubbed the "ghost bomber", remains one of the Pittsburgh region's unsolved mysteries.

1 February
Vought F8U-1 Crusader, BuNo 140444, crashes north of Edwards AFB, California, Vought test pilot Harry T. Brackett killed.
8 February
A flight of eight Royal Air Force Hawker Hunter F1s was redirected to another airfield due to inclement weather. With low visibility over the alternative airfield and little fuel left, six aircraft ran out of fuel and crashed, with one pilot killed.

14 February
US Army de Havilland Canada U-1A Otter, 55-3252, c/n 93, encountered wake turbulence. The aircraft broke up in mid-air and crashed in Toronto, Canada. 4 killed.

16 February
First crash of a Boeing B-52 Stratofortress when B-52, 53–0384, of the 93rd Bomb Wing, Castle Air Force Base, suffered an explosion of an electrical power panel located on the alternator deck blowing off the cover and causing a fire. The cover jammed the regulator valve of the left hand forward alternator disabling the over speed protection and resulting in an over speed failure. Wreckage comes down near Sacramento, California. Four crew eject, four killed. The failure mode was determined later when another B-52 experienced a similar incident that blew off the rear right hand electrical power shield cover but did not cause a fire and Boeing pilot, Ed Hartz, landed safely at Boeing Field in Seattle.

17 February
Douglas R5D-2 Skymaster, BuNo 39116, 'WC 116', on flight from MCAS El Toro, California to NAS Alameda, in low overcast and drizzle, strikes Sunol Ridge on ranch c. 3.5 miles (5.6 km) north of Niles, California at 13:45. Aircraft broke up and burned, killing 35, all but one of them Marines.

24 February
USAF Douglas C-124C Globemaster II, 53-021, en route from Goose Bay, Labrador, to Upper Heyford in the United Kingdom, lost power in number one and four engines (port and starboard outer). Restricted data cargo was jettisoned over the North Atlantic, including nuclear weapon firing and maintenance sets from an altitude of 8,000 to 9,000 feet (2,400 to 2,700 m). The Air Force assumed that the cargo packaging ruptured and sank after impact with the sea. Impact area searched, nothing recovered. On its return flight to Robins AFB, Warner Robins, Georgia, in the U.S. on 2 March, the aircraft crashed in the Atlantic c. 225 nmi (417 km) southwest of Keflavik, Iceland. The aircraft and 17 crew were lost in 3,000 feet (910 m) of water. "The plane ran into difficulty on the northbound trip when two motors failed and it was thought that the ship would have to be ditched. However, it was shepherded into a safe landing with the assistance of the air-sea rescue planes from Keflavik base in Iceland. The two motors were replaced and the ship thoroughly inspected before starting the return trip. Just after midnight of Friday the plane radioed three of its four engines were dead and it was losing altitude rapidly. Then the radio went dead. Later Saturday morning [3 March] search planes found only two bits of wreckage – a flame-scarred oxygen bottle and a shattered piece of plywood – picked up near the position from which the final message had been radioed." One of the victims was T/Sgt. Joseph Kaltner, 32, of Crestview, Florida, a 14-year veteran of the Air Force who had seen action as a gunner in WW II and in the Korean campaign. He was assigned at Robins Air Force Base, Georgia. He is survived by his widow, the former Roslyn Clary, of Crestview; one child, Keitha, 1; his mother, Mrs. Anna Kaltner, and two sisters, Mrs. Theresa Lampman and Mrs. Anna Sapp, all of Trenton, New Jersey, Sgt. Kaltner's home prior to his marriage.

2 March
Two F-89D Scorpions, 53-2641 and 53-2647, of the 321st Fighter-Interceptor Squadron, 326th Fighter Group, 25th Air Division, out of Paine AFB, Washington, crash into Sheer Rock-Granite Spires on Whitehorse Mountain, near Darrington in an attempt to 'thread the needle' while flying advanced maneuvers in mountainous terrain. All four airmen perish high on a rocky cliff and deep in the wilderness. Killed in 53-2641, the last of fifty block D-65-NO Scorpions built, is 1st Lt. Hal Nathan Williams, although no second crewman is listed in the accident report. Killed in 53-2647, the sixth of 25 block D-70-NO Scorpions built, are 1st Lts. Wilford H. Taylor and Norman Dean Petersen.

3 March
"TACOMA, Wash., March 3 (AP) – A huge, crippled refueling aerial tanker was nursed in to a safe landing by its pilot today after 10 other members of the crew parachuted to safety. The plane was a KC96 [sic] Boeing Stratocruiser converted to feed fuel aloft to big jet bombers. The tanker was flying near McChord Air Force Base south of here when the crew leaped to safety. McChord officials said all 10 men had been accounted for."

4 March
"HALSINGBORD, Sweden, March 4, (AP) – Four Swedish jet fighters flying in close formation crashed on a fog-shrouded hill near here today and exploded. The air force said all four pilots perished. A spokesman said the three trailing jets in the formation apparently followed the leader into the 600-foot hill. The spokesman blamed a failure of instruments in the leading plane. The four (J 28) Vampire jets were engaged in a local maneuver." The J28B aircraft, all of F14, on a local flight out of Halmstad, departing there at 07:23 local time, were flying over the waters of Skälderviken in foggy conditions when, due to an incorrect scale in reading maps, they struck the north side of Kullabergsvägen, near Kullaberg, scattering wreckage and body parts over a 300 x 500-meter area. Some parts hung from trees and one engine was found on the other side of the mountain, having been thrown more than a kilometer. The flight impacted Gregers Hill, a high point of Eastern Kullaberg with three peaks of which the northernmost is the highest. With its 174.8 meters above sea level, it is also Kullaberg's second highest point after Håkull. Post-crash fires were extinguished by the snow cover. "The last radio contact with the planes was when they passed Bjärehalvön, they reported an altitude of about 130 meters when they announced that the weather had cleared up slightly." Captain Nils Ahlqvist left a widow and two daughters, but the other three pilots (identities not yet found in the archives) were younger and unmarried. The original mission plan called for 12 Svenska Flygvapnet J28s from Halstad to participate in this exercise in southern Sweden but the foggy conditions caused that to be cut back to just the four Vampires lost in this accident, considered to be one of Swedish aviation history's worst tragedies.

10 March

One of four United States Air Force Boeing B-47E Stratojet bombers of the 369th Bomb Squadron, 306th Bomb Wing (M), out of MacDill AFB, Florida, en route non-stop to Ben Guerir Air Base, Morocco, B-47E-95-BW, 52–534, Inkspot 59, misses tanker meet over the Mediterranean. Extensive search never turns up plane, crew, or two 210DE nuclear capsules. Lost are Captain Robert H. Hodgin, Aircraft Commander, 31; Captain Gordon M. Insley, Observer, 32; and 2nd Lt. Ronald L. Kurtz, Copilot, 22.

13 March
An AFJS Fury jet carrier fighter crashes near Rantoul, Kansas during a training flight, killing the pilot, United States naval aviator and 1952 Olympic diving gold medalist David "Skippy" Browning. Browning was training for the 1956 Summer Olympics at the time of his death.

21 March
"WACO, Tex. (AP) – A B25 missing overnight from Connally Air Force Base was found wrecked in a pasture about 50 miles (80 km) southeast of here Thursday. Highway patrolmen said the six airmen aboard were killed. There was a possibility turbulent weather figured in the crash. Winds with gusts to 35 miles per hour (56 km/h) an hour and some tornadoes lashed through central Texas Wednesday night. None of the victims was from California."

22 March
Douglas AD-5N Skyraider, BuNo 132525, '95', one of a pair on a low-level navigational flight out of NAS North Island, San Diego, California, crashes into Martinez Mountain in the Santa Rosa Mountains, possibly due to a fuel management problem, killing all 3 Navy crew members from Squadron VC-35. "SAN DIEGO (AP) – The Navy said one of its AD5 Skyraider planes crashed and burned Thursday 12 miles southeast of Palm Springs. There was no evidence the pilot survived, the pilot of another Skyraider that was flying wing to the formation reported. The flight was from San Diego Naval Air Station. A ground rescue party was dispatched to the scene, in rugged terrain at the 5,000 foot level on the side of a mountain. Identity of the pilot was withheld, pending notice to relatives. Capt. Henry Erwin, of the 42nd Air Rescue Squadron of March Air Force Base, Riverside, reported sighting smoking wreckage from the air at a level of about 5,000 ft (1,500 m). The country is too rough for dropping parachutists. The Riverside County sheriff's office at Indio started a posse to the scene and four men of the 42nd left March AFB for the area. A Palm Desert woman, Leah Jones, who was out gathering cactus, reported she saw the two planes, then saw smoke rising from the side of a mountain." "RIVERSIDE (AP) – A search party, after a five-hour hike Friday through barren desert mountains, reached the wreckage of a crashed Navy attack bomber and reported finding three bodies. The Navy identified the dead as Lt. (j.g.) Richard H. Haffner, the pilot, whose widow, Jane, lives in San Diego; Donald D. Leeper, 36, aviation machinist 2.C, whose widow, Elizabeth Marie, lives in San Diego; John M. Cooper, 20, aviation electronics man 3.C, unmarried, whose father, John T. Cooper, lives in Jacksonville, Fla. The AD5 from San Diego Naval Air Station crashed Thursday on the slope of a steep canyon at the 4,000-foot level in the remote Santa Rosa Mountains. The scene is about 60 miles (97 km) southeast of here, with the closest town the desert resort of La Quinta. A sheriff's posse radioed the news of finding the bodies. The terrain is so rugged, the report said, that helicopters probably will be required to remove the bodies. The downed plane was flying with another out of San Diego when the crash occurred."

22 March
NACA Boeing P2B-1S Superfortress, BuNo 84029, (built as B-29-95-BW, 45-21787), "Fertile Myrtle", with seven crew aboard, carrying the second Douglas D-558-2 Skyrocket, BuNo 37974, NACA 144, for airdrop from 30,000 ft (9.1 km), experiences runaway starboard outer propeller while climbing over Palmdale. Pilot Stanley P. Butchart immediately noses over and releases the rocket plane early, pilot John B. "Jack" McKay dumps rocket propellants before landing on Rogers Dry Lake, whereupon the number four prop disintegrates, throwing blades into the starboard inner engine, through the fuselage, and into the port inner engine. "Butchart's aileron controls were useless. Copilot Neil A. Armstrong nursed the bomber home on the other three engines and made a perfect landing. All of the fliers are NACA personnel based at nearby Lancaster."

23 March
On 1 February 1957, an Escondidio, California, rancher filed suit against the government for damages caused by the crash of a Navy jet plane on this date. "His Federal Court complaint, asking $6,230.50, said as a result of the crash, his hens stopped laying, his crops were trampled and a fissure in his well caused it to dry up."

25 March
First prototype Martin XB-51, 46-0685, crashes in sand dunes near Biggs AFB, El Paso, Texas, killing both crew. Pilot was Maj. James O. Rudolph, 36, who was dragged from the crash site with severe burns and conveyed to Brook Army Hospital at San Antonio where he succumbed to his injuries 16 April 1956. Eddie Wilkerson, a high school tennis coach, whose car was narrowly missed by the bomber, stopped and pulled the pilot from the wreckage. The flight engineer was S/Sgt. Wilbur R. Savage, 28, of Rte. 3, Dawsonville, Georgia. The aircraft was staging to Eglin AFB, Florida at the time of its crash for filming of scenes for the motion picture Toward the Unknown. After stopping for refuelling, the bomber began its take-off run at 10:30, but smashed through the fence at the end of the southwest runway and then began to disintegrate, spreading wreckage along a 250-yard trail. There was some initial confusion about the aircraft type as rescuers found the "Gilbert XF-120" name applied to the airframe for the film on the wreckage.

26 March
"MASONTOWN, Pa. (AP) – A twin-engine Navy plane carrying a crew of three crashed Monday into the Monongahela River. State police said there was no sign of any survivors."

26 March
"PENSACOLA, Fla. (AP) – Three fliers were killed and a fourth is missing in a fiery collision of two naval trainer planes over Baldwin County, Alabama, Monday. The planes were from Saufley Field, an auxiliary of the Naval Air Station."

Pre-27 March
"SAN DIEGO (UP) – Ryan Aeronautical Co. spokesmen Tuesday disclosed three company employes [sic] were burned when fire damaged a secret vertical-takeoff jet aircraft. The fire occurred in a hangar at Edwards Air Force Base, the spokesmen said. Those burned were Walter Kirby, Cardiff, John Howard, San Diego, and Howard Bianchi, Escondido." This was the Ryan X-13 Vertijet.

28 March
A Boeing B-47B-35-BW Stratojet, 51-2175, of the 3520th FTW, McConnell AFB, Kansas, suffers explosion in bomb bay fuel tank and sheds its wings over East Wichita, Kansas, crashing four miles (6 km) northeast of the city, killing three crew. The office of information services at McConnell Air Force Base, said the explosion occurred after takeoff, probably at about 2,000 feet (610 m) altitude. Lt. Maurice Boyack, pilot of a Navy Lockheed P2V Neptune bomber, out of Naval Air Station Hutchinson, Kansas, said the explosion occurred in a climbing turn. He flew his bomber to a point where he could see the wings rip off the B-47. He said it appeared there was a fire in the midsection, followed by the explosion. Firefighters battled the blaze at the crash scene for more than an hour. The plane crashed within 1,000 feet (300 m) of two large suburban houses. Officials at McConnell AFB identified the pilot and instructor as Capt. William C. Craggs of Wichita. He is survived by his widow and two sons. The students were Lt. Col. William H. Dames, 39, of Oconomowoc, Wisconsin whose wife and two sons are reported to be living in Milwaukee; and 1st Lt. John C. Leysath, 24, of North, South Carolina.

28 March
A McDonnell F-101 Voodoo crashes on the Mojave Desert just north of Edwards Air Force Base, California, after civilian test pilot William Ross successfully bails out. F-101A-1-MC, 53-2419, written off.

28 March
The 300-ton motorship Motul suffers an engine room explosion and fire while c. 60 miles off the coast of Yucatán in the Bay of Campeche early this date. A Mexican Navy Consolidated PBY Catalina responds, and takes aboard some of the 35 survivors of the sunk Motul who took to life rafts, but as it attempts takeoff one of its propellers breaks, disabling it. The following day, the lost ship's 14 crew, 21 passengers, and three naval aviators are all rescued by the Mexican coast guard cutter Virgilio Uribe, which also takes the PBY in tow as it makes its way to Progreso, Mexico.

30 March
Three crew are killed and two seriously injured as a Norton AFB, California,-based Beechcraft C-45 Expeditor on a training flight to McNary Field, Salem, Oregon, rams a rocky hilltop in squally weather on Friday night and catches fire seven miles south of Klamath Falls, Oregon. The survivors who were thrown clear of the wreckage, PFC Leroy D. Wigglesworth, of Gladstone, Oregon, and A2C Virginia F. Bowman, of Portland, Oregon, were taken to a hospital suffering from shock, burns and broken bones. It took rescuers 2 1/2 hours to work their way up a steep hillside to reach the wreckage. They reported three bodies were burnt. The air force withheld the identities of the dead pending notification of next of kin. C-45H, 52-10957. The plane was coming in for a refueling stop when it struck the 4,785-foot high ridge. The three victims were: Lt. Col. Frank Loughary, of 250 5th Street, San Bernardino, chief of military personnel division for the San Bernardino Air Materiel Area, survived by a brother in South America; Lt. Col. Mabry Simmons, who was taking graduate studies at Norton related to his Air Force post at University of Southern California, survived by his widow at 865 Morado Place, Altadena; and S/Sgt. Ray Matzinger, unmarried, his mother Velma Govera lives 11557 Eldridge Street, San Fernando, California. A2C Bowman was catching a ride home from Eglin AFB, Florida, where she is stationed, as was PFC Wigglesworth, stationed at Fort Ord, California.

3 April
A Boeing B-29 Superfortress departs Randolph AFB, San Antonio, Texas, and heads northwest on a training mission. Shortly thereafter, at 15:12, it strikes the WOAI-AM radio mast, knocking it down, and crashing into a cornfield north of the tower. Five of six crew survive.

3 April
USAF Fairchild C-119 Flying Boxcar with five aboard goes missing on a flight between Tachikawa Air Base and Ashiya Air Base, Japan. Wreckage sighted on 5 April at the 6,000 foot level of a 6,100-foot peak on Shikoku Island, 20 miles (32 km) south of Saijo, and more than 400 miles southwest of Tokyo. "An attempt will be made Friday to reach it with a rescue team dropped by parachute."

5 April
Grumman test pilot Ernie von der Heyden bails out over Edwards Flight Test Center, California, when his Grumman F11F Tiger develops trouble of an undisclosed nature while on a routine test flight. "He landed at the edge of a dry lake in uninhabited desert country 10 miles (16 km) from Edwards Air Force Base. He was picked up by helicopter and taken to the Edwards hospital for treatment of what the Air Force called non critical injuries. The plane crashed in the lake bed." Von der Heyden lives in Lancaster with his wife and three children. F11F-1, BuNo 138608, lost due to engine failure, loss of control.

6 April
A Boeing B-47E-130-BW Stratojet, 53-4209, c/n 4501233, of the 307th Bomb Wing departs Lincoln AFB, Nebraska, at c. 11:25 on a northern heading. Approximately 15 minutes later, it exploded and burst into flames at c. 2,000 feet (610 m) altitude, crashing three miles (5 km) south and 3/4 miles east of Ceresco, Nebraska. The crew of four, one over the normal crew complement, was killed.

6 April
A USAF Douglas C-124C-DL Globemaster II, 52-1078, c/n 43987, of the 1501st Air Transport Wing, crashes just after takeoff from Travis AFB, California, killing three of the seven crew on board. Aircraft stalled at 100 feet (30 m), dropped one wing and plunged to the ground just southwest of the base. Airframe splits into three sections, burns. The cause is attributed to incorrect assembly of the elevator and aileron control cables.

6 April
A Northrop F-89C Scorpion crashes in flames between Great Falls, Montana, and Malmstrom Air Force Base, just after a 16:30 takeoff from that base, killing both crew. The navigator was identified as 2d Lt. Alton A. Nelson, 22, of West Sacramento, California. He had been assigned to the 1708th Ferrying Wing, Detachment 1, at McClellan AFB, California. The name of the pilot was withheld. The plane was being ferried to a base in Alaska.

19 April
A U.S. Navy Grumman F9F-6 Cougar, out of NAS Glenview, Illinois, loses control at 19,000 ft (10 km) over Lake Michigan. Reserve pilot ejects but his chute apparently fails to deploy. The plane falls into shallow water about a half mile off of Fort Sheridan and the canopy from the aircraft is recovered by personnel at the fort but there was no sign of Lt. Cmdr. Gordon Arthur Stanley (13 July 1921 – 19 April 1956), 35, assigned to the staff of the chief of naval air reserve training. Stanley, formerly of Oakridge, Oregon, lived with his wife and three children in Arlington Heights. "Officials at Glenview said the plane was one of two on a training flight. The flyer who returned reported that a few seconds after the planes went into clouds at 19,000 feet (5,800 m), Stanley reported by radio that he was 'losing control'. Glenview sent out a helicopter and flying boat PBY air-sea rescue unit, and within a few minutes both reported seeing the lost plane in shallow water half a mile off the fort. Neither saw any trace of the pilot." Navy officials said that the accident occurred at 13:30 and that they were notified by phone from Fort Sheridan within five minutes. The rescue units were airborne at 13:40. Stanley was an ace, having scored eight victories with VF-27 while flying from the USS Princeton.

19 April
A Lockheed TV-2 Shooting Star from an auxiliary field of Naval Air Station Corpus Christi, Texas, with one aboard, and a twin-engine Beechcraft from NAS Corpus Christi, with three aboard, collide over the outskirts of Corpus Christi, killing all four, and scattering wreckage over an area of a square mile. There was only minor property damage on the ground and no injuries reported. All the bodies are recovered.

22 April
A Royal Canadian Navy McDonnell F2H-3 Banshee, BuNo 126330, flown by Lt. D.A. "Duke" Wardrop of test squadron VX-10, inexplicably descends into dense clouds and disappears over the Atlantic Ocean off Yarmouth, Nova Scotia during a ferry flight from Naval Air Station Quonset Point, Rhode Island, US, to naval air station HMCS Shearwater, Nova Scotia, Canada. The pilot of a second Banshee accompanying Wardrop's aircraft attempts to contact him by radio, but no response is heard, and no traces of the missing pilot or aircraft are ever found, despite an extensive search effort by the RCN and the United States Navy. Equipment failure and hypoxia are suspected causes.

24 April
Ninth of 13 North American X-10s, GM-52-2, c/n 9, on Navaho X-10 flight number 21, out of Cape Canaveral, Florida, ground control system failure results in missile crashing at sea at Mach 1.25 200 km from the Cape.

2 May
A USAF Boeing B-47E-85-BW Stratojet, 52-0450, c/n 450732, of the 98th Bomb Wing (also reported as of the 372d Bomb Squadron, 307th Bomb Wing), crashes short of runway, Lincoln AFB, Nebraska. One account states that it was on instrument approach. Another states that it came down "three miles short of the Northwest runway after departing on an evening training mission. Eyewitnesses said the plane appeared to be trying to belly in for a landing, crashed, then exploded and burned. The crash site was on farmland owned by Edmund Nelson, ½ mile west of 79 Hi-way and 2 ½ miles north of U.S. 34." KWF are Captain Marion J. Perdue, aircraft commander, 33, San Antonio, Texas; 2nd Lieutenant Linwood M. McIntosh, co-pilot, 22, Dallas, Texas; Captain Charles H. Stonesifer, navigator/bombardier, 35, Maricopa, California; and Staff Sergeant William F. Rockholt, crew chief, 24, Fellows, California. All crew were from the 345th Bomb Squadron.

8 May
A USAF Martin B-57C-MA Canberra, 53-3858, crashes on the Ship Shole island bombing range near Langley AFB, Virginia, killing both crew. From the accident report: "Cause of accident – Undetermined: The aircraft was observed to be flying in a northeasterly direction at an estimated 500 feet (150 m) altitude and traveling at a high rate of speed. It was probable that the speed was 425 knots indicated, because this was the prebriefed airspeed since the aircraft was on the run-in route on the LABS bombing range. Witnesses observing the aircraft reported that everything appeared to be normal. The aircraft was then seen to abruptly dive and disappear; this was followed by an immediate explosion. The instructor pilot and the pilot of this dual control B-57C received fatal injuries."

10 May
A USAF Lockheed T-33, crashes while attempting to conduct an emergency landing at Quonset Point Naval Air Station in Rhode Island. The aircraft departed Suffolk County Air Force Base in Westhampton, New York for an instrument check flight, during which the aircraft's radar compass malfunctioned. At approximately 12:30 P.M. the aircraft ran out of fuel over Block Island, three miles off the Rhode Island Coast. The crew ejected and landed safely in the water several miles apart from each other. Navy and Air Force helicopters were immediately dispatched and located the pilots due to the yellow dye markers each pilot carried. During the recovery attempt of the observer, Lt. William J. Reichard, the helicopter's hoist failed and the airmen fell back into the water, suffering fatal injuries. Capt. Howard M. Blanton was found lifeless by a Coast Guard boat, attempts to revive the pilot failed.

15 May
A RCAF Avro CF-100 Mk. IVB Canuck, 18367, of 445 Squadron, out of CFB Uplands, falling from 33,000 feet (10,000 m) crashed into Villa St. Louis, a convent of the Grey Nuns of the Cross in Orleans, Ontario, Canada between roughly 22:15 and 23:00 (reports vary). "[T]he million dollar brick building...was demolished." 15 people were killed; both crewmen of the aircraft, a priest, 11 nuns and one other woman. "Mrs. Marie Flora, who lives nearby, said the plane swooped over her home in flames and crashed into the three-story convent building between the second and top floors. There was a big explosion. 'They never had a chance,' she said."

15 May
Fifth Lockheed U-2A, Article 345, 56–6678, delivered to the CIA on 16 December 1955, crashes at Groom Lake, Nevada, killing Agency pilot Wilburn S. "Billy" Rose. Aircraft had just departed Groom with a full fuel load, but an underwing pogo hung up. Pilot attempted to return to try to shake it loose, but let angle of bank increase too much and fully fueled starboard wing kept dropping.

5 June
A USAF Northrop F-89D-15-NO Scorpion fighter jet, 51-11314, of the 18th Fighter-Interceptor Squadron armed with 104 live rockets, strikes an automobile during an aborted take-off at Wold-Chamberlain Field, Minneapolis, Minnesota, United States, killing three of the five occupants of the vehicle; both F-89 crew members survive.

9 June
A Grumman F9F-4 Panther, BuNo 125945, of VMF-213, flown by a USMC Reserve pilot crashes into a row of houses near Wold-Chamberlain Field, striking the home at 5820 46th Avenue South, Minneapolis, Minnesota, United States. In addition to killing the pilot, Maj. George E. Armstrong, the crash kills five and injures twelve on the ground, most of whom are young children. This is the second time in five days that a military jet operating from this airport crashes and kills multiple civilians on the ground.

9 June
Shorts chief test pilot, New Zealand-born, ex-RNZAF, RAF, and ETPS-trained Squadron Leader Walter J. "Wally" Runciman, flying Short SB.6 Seamew, XE175, the fourth Seamew prototype, in a demonstration at the Sydenham Air Display, Sydenham Airport, Belfast, Northern Ireland, is killed when the exhibition "went wrong" and the aircraft crashed. The aircraft entered a slow roll. The nose fell and the pilot seemed to be trying to finish with a half loop, but with insufficient height, the aircraft struck the runway nose first, with fatal result. This airframe had been flown by Runciman for a series of sales tours in 1956 to Italy (March), Yugoslavia (April) and West Germany (May).

16 June
A USAF MATS Douglas C-124A Globemaster II, 51-5183, inbound to Enewetak Atoll, Pacific Ocean, carrying nuclear test device components (possibly for the EGG device fired during the Operation Redwing Mohawk test) crashed 421 feet (128 m) short of, and eight feet (2.4 m) below, the runway at Enewetak Island, shearing off its landing gear and coming to rest 2,000 feet (610 m) from the southeast end of the runway. Fire ensued, extinguished within three hours. No loss of life – most of the cargo, although damaged by water and foam, was recovered. The runway was cleared of wreckage and reopened to normal traffic before noon on 17 June:. Salvage of certain aircraft components was accomplished by a team from Hickam AFB, Hawaii.

26 June
A USAF Boeing KC-97 of the 509th Air Refueling Squadron, 509th Bomb Wing, crashes shortly after an 18:50 take off from Walker AFB, New Mexico, coming down in an open field 10 miles (16 km) south of the base near Roswell, killing all eleven crew. The tanker caught fire shortly after departure on what the Air Force described as a training flight. Observers on the base flight line said that it spun into the ground and exploded. "Word of the crash was not released by the Air Force until more than three and a half hours after the flaming tragedy, on orders of Col. George W. Porter, the base commander."

28 June
An Argentine Air Force Vickers VC.1 Viking T-5 crashed at Resistencia, Argentina.

6 July
"ST. JOHN'S, Nfld. (UP)-A U.S. Air Force tanker exploded and crashed in flames Friday in a desolate mountain area 45 miles east of Goose Bay air base in Labrador. All six crew members apparently were killed. Helicopters braved dangerous winds to hover over the crash scene. Only scattered wreckage was seen from the air. The pilot of an accompanying Stratotanker said he did not see any parachutes after the four-engined KC97 exploded and fell. The Air Force said the plane was one of four Stratotankers from Lake Charles Air Force Base on temporary duty at Goose Bay."

6 July
"HONOLULU (AP)-A Marine helicopter rescue team Friday identified from the air the wreckage of a two-engine Marine plane which crashed in rugged Oahu mountains with four men aboard. The Navy said the rescue team, which apparently was unable to land near the wreckage immediately, reported 'the tail section is still smouldering.' There were no reports of whether anyone is alive the Navy said."

7 July
A USAF Air Training Command Lockheed T-33A-1-LO Shooting Star, 51-17429, c/n 580-17462, of the 3700th FMS, based out of Lackland AFB, Texas, crashes into side of Pleasant Mountain, four miles north-northwest of Denmark, Maine, killing Capt. Gordon L. Draheim. Cause determined to be disorientation and fuel exhaustion.

7 July
"EL SEGUNDO (AP)-Test pilot Raleigh Guynes of Douglas Aircraft Co. bailed out safely from an F4D1 Skyray which went into a spin and crashed into the Pacific Ocean".

8 July
The pilot of a North American F-86F Sabre out of Norton AFB, California, is killed when he crashes in San Dimas, California, on Sunday afternoon, on W. Allen Street, digging a hole six feet (1.8 m) deep and 30 feet (9.1 m) wide. The aircraft, which one witness said came across San Dimas in a southeasterly direction, passed over a park and narrowly missed a group of 200 Little League players picnicking there before striking power and telephone lines and exploding in the street where it ruptured a gas main and set fire to trees in the yard of Mr. and Mrs. Arnold Bayer. Several grass fires were extinguished as well. Air Force officials withheld the pilot's identity pending notification of the next of kin. His body was not immediately recovered. The Daily Sun, San Bernardino, California, reported on 10 July that the pilot was identified as Lt. Oliver L. Dillingham, 23, from Williams AFB, Arizona. He entered the Air Force in 1950 and saw service in Korea in 1954. The story also adds that the explosion after the crash set a house alight and slightly burned two girls.

13 July
USAF Douglas C-118A Liftmaster, 53-3301, c/n 44671, encountered windshear after takeoff at c. 16:00 from McGuire Air Force Base, lost altitude and crashed in pine-wooded swamp near Fort Dix, New Jersey, 46 killed, 20 survivors. The aircraft broke into several pieces as it landed on its belly but did not burn. The aircraft, carrying 10 crew, 41 enlisted men, nine officers and six civilians, was bound for Burtonwood, England, and was taking servicemen and military dependents to foreign posts. Weather was described as rain and a hail storm. "Capt. Tom Hamrick, information officer at Dix, said the pilot apparently tried to level off and crash land. The plane cut a swath through the brush and pines for 300 yards."

13 July
A USAF Boeing B-47E-100-BW Stratojet, 52-0572, of the 40th Bomb Wing crashes and explodes at the end of the runway on take off from Smoky Hill Air Force Base, Kansas, killing all four crew. "Witnesses said the plane just got off the runway and cleared a fence before crashing and bursting into flames. The explosion followed."

13 July
Two North American F-86 Sabres, of the 82d Fighter Squadron, collide in mid-air c. eight miles east of Dixon, California, and crash in an open field, the California Highway Patrol reports. Both pilots eject and parachute safely and are recovered by state officers, a patrolman said. The pilot of Gov. Goodwin J. Knight's plane, flying in the vicinity, spotted the chutes and radioed their position and then served as an observer until the CHP located the pilots. They were found to have suffered only minor injuries. "A spokesman at Travis Air Force Base identified the pilots as 1st Lt. Albert C. Mitchell and 1st Lt. Albert F. Crews of the 82nd Fighter Squadron at Travis."

13 July
"EL CENTRO (AP)-The pilot of an AD6 Skyraider was killed Friday when his plane crashed on the desert 25 miles (40 km) northwest of here during a practice dive bombing mission. The Navy said he was attached to a fleet air gunnery unit at the El Centro Naval Auxiliary Air Station. His name was withheld pending notification of the family."

13 July
"Belington, W. Va., July 13, UP – A navy Fury jet fighter plane en route from Patuxent, Md. naval air test center to Columbus, O., crashed, exploded and burned on a farm north of here today, killing the pilot Lt. Cmdr. Horatio Gates Sickel Jr." Aircraft was FJ-3, BuNo 136091.

15 July
"CLAREMORE, Okla. (UP)-An Air Force pilot, with both engines gone, 'deadsticked' his C45 transport to a perfect landing between two underpasses on an uncompleted toll highway near here Sunday. The pilot, Capt. Charles Bixel, 38, Riverside, Calif., and his sole passenger, A-2C Josef Grafues, St. Louis, were not hurt. The plane was undamaged."

16 July
Test pilot Andrey G. Kochetkov attempts first flight in first of three flying prototypes of the ultra long-range, high-altitude single-seat super interceptor Lavochkin La-250, but encounters an unexpectedly rapid roll moment and loses control. Pilot survives.

17 July
"FALLON, Nev. (AP)-The runway arresting gear, plus his own sprinting ability, saved Navy jet pilot Stanley A. Roitz of Trinidad, Colo., from death or serious injury Tuesday. Roitz, 22, who just made lieutenant junior grade Monday, was taking off in an FJ3 fury [sic] jet when it suffered a sudden power failure before leaving the runway, at the Fallon Naval Auxiliary Air Station. The craft plunged into the net-like arresting gear at the end of the runway and came to a halt as it tumbled over the gear. Roitz dived out head first, somersaulted to land on his feet and took off running. The plane's fuel tanks exploded a moment later, setting a fire that consumed the craft. Roitz is regularly stationed at Moffett Field, Calif., but was here with his squadron for aerial gunnery practice." FJ-3, BuNo 136139. upgraded to FJ-3M. with VF-191 in 1956, written off this date.

27 July
A USAF Boeing B-47E-130-BW Stratojet, 53-4230, of the 307th Bomb Wing from Lincoln AFB, Nebraska, crashes while making touch-and-goes at RAF Lakenheath, skidding off runway and into nuclear weapons storage igloo holding three Mark 6 nuclear bombs, burns. No weapons in the facility go off and all are later repaired. Stratojet was unarmed. One of the most common myths about this accident is that the weapons, if they had detonated, would have "turned southeast England into a desert." The three Mark 6 bombs were in storage, and therefore no nuclear capsules were installed, nor stored in the building (the nuclear capsule was manually installed in the Mk 6, and only when airborne and just prior to strike). Each Mk 6 did contain at least 5,000 pounds of high explosives, and depleted uranium. Even if the weapons had detonated because of fire, there would not have been a nuclear reaction (U-238 is not fissionable through high explosive compression or fire).
31 July
In a high-speed flight, prototype Folland Gnat, G-39-2, suffers tailplane flutter which breaks away. Folland test pilot bails out and descends safely, becoming first person to use the Folland/Saab ejection seat in action.

2 August
U.S. Navy F2H-3 Banshee, BuNo 126341, of VF-64, out of NAS Alameda, California, crashes at 15:35 at the c. 11,000 foot level on Mt. Pinchot in the Eastern Sierra Nevadas near Bishop while on a practice strafing run, pilot LTJG Tulane Oden Phillips killed.

6 August
Spanish Air Force North American F-86F Sabre, C.5–4 crashes.

16 August
The Battle of Palmdale was the attempted shoot-down of a runaway Grumman F6F-5K Hellcat drone by United States Air Force interceptors in the skies over Southern California. The drone was launched at 11:34 PDT from Point Mugu Naval Air Station and soon went out of control. Northrop F-89D Scorpion interceptor aircraft of the 437th Fighter-Interceptor Squadron took off from Oxnard Air Force Base and caught up to the drone, but were ultimately unable to bring it down, in spite of expending all of their 208 rockets. After it ran out of fuel, the unmanned aircraft crashed in a sparsely populated tract of desert. During the incident over 1000 acres were scorched and a substantial amount of property was damaged or destroyed.

27 August
Eighth of 13 North American X-10s, GM-52-1, c/n 8, on Navaho X-10 flight number 24, out of Cape Canaveral, Florida, a full-range test with final dive maneuver. Final flight of vehicle eight after three successful recovered missions. During takeoff the vehicle goes aloft, then settles back to the runway with its brakes locked. The tires burst, the gear fails, the gear doors come in contact with the runway, carving grooves in the pavement as they retract. Then, astonishingly, the vehicle rises from the runway, completes a successful full-range supersonic flight with terminal dive into the waters off Grand Bahamas.

27 August
North American AJ-2 Savage, BuNo 130419, assigned to Heavy Attack Squadron SEVEN (VAH-7) at Naval Auxiliary Air Station Sanford, Florida experiences a loss of an engine and crashes into a residential neighborhood approximately 1/2 mile west-southwest of the air station while on an emergency approach to landing. The mishap results in the loss of the entire crew of three plus multiple fatal and non-fatal civilian casualties on the ground.

31 August
Fourteenth Lockheed U-2A, 56-6687, Article 354, delivered to the Central Intelligence Agency 27 July 1956. Crashed at Groom Lake, Nevada, this date during a night training flight, killing pilot Frank G. Grace Jr. Pilot became disoriented by lights near the end of the runway and flew into a telephone pole.

31 August
Boeing WB-50D Superfortress, 49–315, c/n 16091, "The Golden Heart", (built as a B-50D-115-BO), of the 58th Weather Reconnaissance Squadron, out of Eielson AFB, Alaska, crashed early in the morning this date on a sandy island in the Susitna River, 50 miles (80 km) northwest of Anchorage, Alaska, killing all 11 crew. The flight was last heard from at 03:02 local time, when it was over Talkeetna, a check-in station 50 miles north of the ten-mile-long island. The wreckage was found about 5 1/2 hours later by a member of the 71st Air Rescue Squadron. "All that remained when helicopters landed at the crash scene was a smoking pile of rubble."

10 September
During first flight of North American F-107A at Edwards AFB, California, prototype, 55-5118, experiences problem with engine gearbox differential pressure during a dive, North American test pilot Bob Baker lands on dry lakebed at just under 200 knots (370 km/h), after rolling about a mile, aircraft hits a depression in the lakebed, nose gear collapses. Jet slides c. three-tenths of a mile on its nose, but suffers limited damage, no fire. Total landing roll was 22,000 feet (6,700 m). Airframe repaired in under two weeks.

10 September
Boeing B-50B-45-BO Superfortress, 47–133, c/n 15817, modified as RB-50G with additional radar and B-50D-type nose, of the 6091st Reconnaissance Squadron, out of Yokota Air Base, Japan, disappears over Sea of Japan. Probably went down in Typhoon Emma.

17 September
Boeing B-52B Stratofortress, 53–393, of the 93d Bombardment Wing (Heavy), crashes after an in-flight fire while returning to Castle AFB, California. Lost wing in subsequent dive, crashing near Highway 99, nine miles SE of Madera, California. Five crew killed, two bailed out safely.

17 September
Sixth Lockheed U-2A, Article 346, 56–6679, delivered to the CIA on 13 January 1956, crashes during climb-out from Wiesbaden Air Base, Germany, when the aircraft of Detachment A, stalls at 35,000 feet (11,000 m), killing Agency pilot Howard Carey. Cause of accident never satisfactorily determined.

21 September
Grumman company test pilot Tom Attridge shoots himself down in a Grumman F11F Tiger, BuNo 138620, during a Mach 1.0 20 degree dive from 22,000 feet (6,700 m) to 7,000 feet (2,100 m). He fires two bursts from the fighter's 20 mm cannon during the descent and as he reaches 7,000 feet (2,100 m) the jet is struck multiple times, including one shell that is ingested by the engine, shredding the compressor blades. He limps the airframe back towards the Grumman airfield but comes down at almost the same spot where the first prototype impacted on 19 October 1954. Pilot gets clear before jet burns, suffers broken leg and vertebrae – investigation shows that he had overtaken and passed through his own gunfire.

27 September
Test pilot Mel Apt is killed on the 17th flight of the Bell X-2, 46–674, out of Edwards Air Force Base, California, when he attempts a turn at Mach 3.2 (nearly 2,100 mph), and the airframe goes into a vicious case of inertia coupling. Apt jettisons the escape capsule but runs out of height before he can bail out of the falling nose section.

1 October
The RAF's first Avro Vulcan B.1, XA897, which completed a fly-the-flag mission to New Zealand in September, approaches Heathrow in bad weather on GCA approach, crashing short of the runway. Two pilots eject, but four crew do not have ejection seats and are killed. Aircraft Captain Squadron Leader "Podge" Howard and co-pilot Air Marshal Sir Harry Broadhurst survive. Signal delays in the primitive Ground-Controlled Approach system of the time may have let the aircraft descend too low without being warned. Undercarriage damaged in contact short of runway with control lost during attempted go-around.

6 October
A USAF Lockheed T-33A Shooting Star overruns runway while landing at Mitchel AFB, Long Island, New York, runs through perimeter fence, flips over, ending up on the Hempstead Turnpike. Pilot Maj. Daniel Kramer killed, three in an auto are injured.

10 October
A United States Navy Douglas R6D-1 Liftmaster, BuNo 131588, c/n 43691/321, of Air Transport Squadron 6 (VR-6), assigned to the Military Air Transport Service, disappears over the Atlantic Ocean about 150 miles (240 km) north of the Azores. All 59 aboard – 50 U.S. Air Force passengers from Lincoln Air Force Base and the crew of nine U.S. Navy personnel – died. Another source cites 11 October: as crash date.

10 October
Two U.S. Air Force F-86 Sabre Jets collided over Lake Michigan. The Lake freighter S/S Ernest T. Weir, Captain Ray R. Redecker, rescued one of the pilots (Lt. Kenneth R. Hughes) after he spent three hours in the water. Several other ships in the area participated in an unsuccessful attempt to locate the second pilot.

18 October
A Lockheed P2V-2N Neptune, of Squadron VX-6, crashes in a storm at McMurdo Station, Antarctica, during Operation Deep Freeze II. Captain Rayburn Hudman, USMC; Lieutenant David W. Carey, USNR; Aviation Electronics Technician 1 Charles S. Miller, USN; and Aviation Machinist’s Mate 1 Marian O. Marze, USN, are KWF.
24 October
Midair collision involving USAF T-33A and civil Cessna 170. Occurred over Midland, Tx.. Seven fatalities. Accident occurred over a Southwest Midland neighborhood, one house burned, seven others damaged. No fatalities or injuries on ground. Dead included 2 USAF aircrew, 5 civilian- all from 1 family. 1 aircrewman ejected from the USAF trainer, based out of Webb AFB, Texas, but his parachute failed to open.
25 October
First (of two) Bell XV-3s, 54–147, first flown 11 August 1955, crashes this date when pilot Dick Stansbury blacks out due to extremely high cockpit vibrations when the rotor shafts are moved 17 degrees forward from vertical. Pilot is seriously injured and airframe is damaged beyond repair. Cause was dynamic instability, also known as air resonance. Design was initially designated XH-33.

26 October
A USAF Fairchild C-119G-FA Flying Boxcar, 51-8026A, c/n 10769, of the 61st Troop Carrier Squadron, 314th Troop Carrier Wing, Tactical Air Command, Sewart Air Force Base, Tennessee, on a cargo airlift mission to Olmsted Air Force Base, Pennsylvania, crashes seven miles north of Newport, Perry County, Pennsylvania at c. 15:15 ET, killing four crew. The weather at Olmsted was fluctuating rapidly with rain and fog, and at 14:00 the pilot reported a missed approach to the field. After being cleared to altitude over the Lancaster beacon the conditions at Olmsted improved to above minimums and the pilot requested another approach. At 1506 Eastern he was cleared for a straight-in approach from New Kingston Fan Marker to Olmsted. At 15:09 he reported leaving the New Kingston Fan Marker inbound and at 15:11 he reported leaving 3,000 feet (910 m). The aircraft crashed in mountainous terrain 22.5 nmi west of the Kingston Fan Marker. KWF are 1st Lt. Robert Siegfried Hantsch, pilot, Walter Beverly Gordon Jr., co-pilot, T/Sgt. Marvin W. Seigler, engineer, and 1st Lt. Gracye E. Young, of the 4457th USAF Hospital, Sewart AFB. The Perry County Times reported that the aircraft struck the side of the mountain in Toboyne Township in the Three Square Hollow of the Tuscarora State Forest, "one of the most desolate in Central Pennsylvania." Some 150 rescuers had to battle heavy underbrush as well as fog and rain to get to the crash site and did not reach the scene until about 21:00. In 2006, the Pennsylvania Department of Conservation and Natural Resources erected a plaque near the site in memory of those killed.

November
First launch attempt of the Northrop XSM-64 Navaho at Cape Canaveral, Florida, fails after 26 seconds of flight.

6 November
A Boeing B-47E-60-BW Stratojet, 51-2421, c/n 450474, of the 96th Bombardment Wing, Altus AFB, Oklahoma, suffers engine trouble while on a routine training mission late Tuesday, crashing on a farm near Hobart, Oklahoma, killing four crew. According to Ranson Hancock, publisher of the Hobart Democrat Chief, the bomber hit the ground about 320 yards west of a barn owned by Charles C. Harris, skidded into the barn and exploded. Officials identified the victims as Maj. Joseph E. Wilford, aircraft commander, Capt. Francis P. Bouschard, pilot, Capt. Lee D. Ellis Jr., instructor-aircraft observer, all having families at Altus, and 1st Lt. Andrew J. Toalson, observer, Bartlesville, Oklahoma.

9 November
Second prototype Martin XP6M-1 Seamaster, BuNo 138822, c/n XP-2, first flown 18 May 1956, crashes at 15:36 near Odessa, Delaware, due to faulty elevator jack. As seaplane noses up at c. 21,000 feet (6,400 m) and fails to respond to control inputs, crew of four ejects, pilot Robert S. Turner, co-pilot William Cunningham, and two crew all parachuting to safety. Airframe breaks up after falling to 6,000 feet (1,800 m) before impact.

24 November
A Boeing B-47E-60-BW Stratojet, 51-5233, c/n 450518, of the 341st Bomb Wing, runs off runway upon landing at Dyess AFB, Texas, tearing away the port inboard engine nacelle. Aircraft may have been also attempting a go-around. All crew survives.

5 December
A Northrop XSM-62 Snark, 53-8172, N-69D test model, fitted with new 24-hour stellar inertial guidance system, launches from Cape Canaveral Missile Test Annex, Florida, wanders off-course, ignores destruct command, disappears over Brazil. It is found by a farmer in January 1983.

7 December
Avro Shackleton MR.3, WR970, first flown 2 September 1955, and operated by Avro for stall-warning development, crashes while on local flight out of Woodford Airport (WFD/EGCD), United Kingdom; spirals into ground near Foolow, killing all four crew.
A Soviet Navy Ilyushin Il-28U of the 50th Guards Independent Reconnaissance Regiment (based in Primorsky Krai) crashes into a mountain. Crew of three dies.

19 December
Seventeenth Lockheed U-2A, 56-6690, Article 357, delivered to the Central Intelligence Agency 21 September 1956, crashes in Arizona this date, Detachment C pilot Bob Ericson successfully bailing out after losing control due to hypoxia caused by a faulty oxygen feed.

30 December
A United States Air Force Lockheed C-121C, 54–165, of the 1608th Transport Wing, based at Charleston AFB, South Carolina, crashes on approach to Dhahran, Saudi Arabia, while flying UN troops into the Suez Canal zone. It was also slated to carry Hungarian refugees back to Charleston AFB, South Carolina. 12 of 38 onboard killed. Air Force headquarters at Wiesbaden, Germany, said that a manifest showed 38 persons – 27 passengers and only 11 crewmen – were aboard the aircraft. Amongst the fatalities were Major Clyde W. Ellis, aircraft commander; Master Sergeant Frank A. Lorch, flight engineer; 1st Lieutenant La Verne W. Alitz, first pilot; and Sergeant Frank A. Rodgers, flight engineer. All three were residents of North Charleston, South Carolina. As of 1 January, the names of three others reported dead on arrival at the Dharan hospital had not been released. "Seven crew members are listed among the survivors. Their conditions and that of a foreign observer are:" 1st Lieutenant Robert F. Wearley, of Charleston Heights, South Carolina, co-pilot, critical; 1st Lieutenant Peter Goch, of Jersey City, New Jersey, navigator, critical; 1st Lieutenant Thomas W. Heenan, of Glen Ellyn, Illinois, navigator, critical. "The condition of the following was listed as fair to good:" 2d Lieutenant Robert L. Saylors, of Ninety Six, South Carolina, navigator; Airman 2d Class (WAF) Florence A. Hogan, of Stamford, Connecticut, flight attendant; Staff Sergeant Robert D. Proctor, of Charleston, flight attendant; Staff Sergeant Robert J. Sanders, of Charleston, flight attendant; and Lieutenant Colonel Ali A. Raft, a transportation observer of MATS operations, from Iran. "The Charleston Air Base public information officer said the aircraft was on a regular transport mission to the U.S. Air Force Base at Dhahran, which is leased from Saudi Arabia and is one of the global chain of strategic bases." It was one of three flying into Dhahran from Tripoli, Libya, an eleven-hour flight. The other two aircraft landed at Muharraq Airport on Bahrain Island, in the Persian Gulf, a short distance from the crash site. The C-121 "is reported to have crashed into sand and burned about 1,000 yards from the runway while attempting to land during heavy fog." Captain Irving H. Breslauer, the public information officer at Charleston AFB, said that the aircraft left Charleston on Thursday 27 December with 12 crew members for Dhahran, by way of McGuire AFB, New Jersey, Lajes Field in the Azores, and Tripoli. Colonel Clinton C. Wasem, commander of the 1608th Transport Wing, left Charleston for Dhahran on 31 December to conduct an investigation into the cause of the crash.

== 1957 ==
10 January
A Boeing B-52D Stratofortress, 55-0082, of the 70th Bomb Squadron, 42d Bomb Wing, crashes near Loring AFB, Maine, during a training flight. The Instructor Pilot (IP) directed the co-pilot to close his eyes while he put the aircraft into an unusual attitude, and then instructed him to recover. The co-pilot misread the data from the flight instruments and took the wrong corrective action, causing the airframe to disintegrate. There were nine men aboard – the crew plus the IP, and two instructors. The co-pilot survived. It was his third time in a crash, and his third time as the sole survivor. This was the fourth B-52 lost, and the first D-model attrited.

10 January
An Air Force Boeing KB-29P Superfortress, 44-84029, built as a B-29B-55-BA, crashes on landing at Bergstrom Air Force Base, near Austin, Texas, killing six crewmen and injuring three others.

11 January
An Argentine Air Force Vickers VC.1 Viking T-11 crashed at Aeroparque, Buenos Aires, Argentina.

12 January
One of two U.S. fighter jets flying over Long Island “disappeared” as both began to descend from a 40,000 foot altitude. The missing pilot was Lt. William J. O’Donnell, a Korean War veteran and a member of the Navy’s 836th Squadron, which was based at the Brooklyn Air Station. He took off from Floyd Bennett on a two hour training mission. Authorities believe O’Donnell’s plane either exploded or ran out of fuel while he was attempting to maneuver back to his base. His plane is believed to have gone down in the ocean 10 miles south of West Hampton Beach. Despite extensive search efforts, no trace or any evidence of the plane were ever found.

14 January
"LONG BEACH (AP) – Another death resulted yesterday from a plane crash that already had taken three lives. Mrs. Margaret Willock, 58, died at Seaside Hospital of burns suffered when a Marine Skyraider smashed into the bindery where she was working Monday morning. Two other persons working in the bindery were killed in the crash. They were Austin W. Rafferty, 43, of Long Beach, co-owner of the binding firm, and Mrs. Ethyl Foust, 28, of Wilmington, an employe. [sic] First Lt. Dale Fortine, 26, of Costa Mesa, the pilot of the single-engine plane, was killed when his parachute failed to open after he bailed out of the diving craft at low altitude. Fortine's radioman, 20-year-old Cp. Joseph P. Licato, parachuted safely from the stricken plane. Capt. John Lippard, public information officer at El Toro Marine Station, where the plane was based, said the right leg and sleeve of Fortine's flying suit were found to have been burned off. Lippard said the pilot's leg was severely burned. This was seen as an indication that the pilot stayed with the plane as long as he could, said Lippard. Reports from witnesses indicated Fortine was trying to steer the plane away from a schoolyard about a block from the crash scene. The plane plowed through a warehouse before hitting the bindery."

15 January
A major fire guts two maintenance hangars at McChord AFB, Washington, destroying a Douglas C-118 Liftmaster, a Douglas C-124 Globemaster II, and damaging two smaller planes. The fire broke out about 05:30 PST and was brought under control two hours later. C-118A, 53-3263, and Douglas C-124C, 52-1027, were destroyed. Two other planes, a Lockheed T-33 jet and a de Havilland Canada L-20 Beaver were damaged.

17 January
During the second bomber stream of training mission, "WEDDING BRAVO", by 30 Convair B-36 Peacemaker bombers of the 7th Bomb Wing, out of Carswell AFB, Texas, a jet engine explosion results in one B-36 landing at Barksdale AFB, Louisiana, on fire. There was no further damage to the aircraft and no injuries to the crew, commanded by Capt. Robert L. Lewis.

17 January
A Boeing WB-50D Superfortress, 48-093, c/n 15902, (built as B-50D-95-BO) of the 58th Weather Reconnaissance Squadron, fully loaded with fuel for a 3,700-mile weather reconnaissance flight, crashes two minutes after a pre-dawn takeoff from Eielson AFB, Alaska, with the wreckage and fuel burning in an inferno 200 yards long and 50 yards wide on the flat land three miles (5 km) north of the base. All twelve crew are killed.

17 January
"HONOLULU (UP) – A Navy pilot, Lt. (JG) Kenneth R. West Jr., 24, of Burlingame, Calif., was killed when his FJ3 Fury jet crashed in the ocean shortly after takeoff from Kaneohe Air Station."

17 January
The crash of Martin B-57E-MA Canberra, 55-4283, c/n 385, at Biggs AFB, Texas, kills two and injures a third. Killed are 1st Lt. Russell E. Hanson, 24, Cudahy, Wisconsin, and 1st Lt. Thomas H. Higgins, 24, Walled Lake, Michigan.

19 January
A U.S. Navy Douglas R5D Skymaster, attempting a late afternoon landing at NAS Sand Point, Seattle, Washington, skids in snow on its third attempt and flips onto its back, losing the port wing in the process. The 46 aboard escape injury. Transport was out of NAS Los Alamitos. California.

20 January
As three Grumman F9F Panthers out of NAS Glenview, Illinois, manoeuver into the landing pattern at Kirtland AFB, New Mexico, two collide at c. 1,000 feet (300 m), their wings become locked together, and both jets crash. One pilot ejects but his chute fails to function, his body found about a half mile from the wreckage of his plane. The other pilot was found in the burned wreckage of his fighter. Killed are Lt. Cmdr. Charles R. Walton, 38, of Wheaton, Illinois; and Lt. Jerome Fishel, 33, Urbana, Illinois. Cmdr. Benjamin G. Preston, executive officer at Glenview, was leading the two pilots on a training mission. He said that they were Navy reserve officers, and that they were en route to NAS Miramar, California, for a two-week training cruise.

20 January
A California Air National Guard North American F-86A Sabre of the 196th Fighter Interceptor Squadron, Ontario International Airport, explodes over the eastern city limits of San Diego and crashes in open country a mile north of Lake Murray Reservoir. The pilot, Capt. Robert E. Dixon, of Spring Valley, California, is killed. The reservoir keeper and others saw the plane explode as it flew under storm clouds and headed north. Wreckage fell over a mile-square area on the south slope of Black Mountain.

20 January
A Beechcraft C-45 Expeditor on the final leg home to Nellis AFB, Nevada, strikes a snow-shrouded mountain near Baker, California, killing the three on board. En route from March AFB, California, the transport struck 7,933-foot Clark Mountain, adjacent to the Baker grade at c. 16:00. Visibility was zero with a snowstorm above the 4,500-foot level (1,400 m). The plane impacted at the 5,000-foot level. "The crash scene, near the Nevada state line, was reached first by California Highway Patrol officer Frederick J. Bosworth. He hiked three miles (5 km) to the crash site after an unidentified truck driver called the CHP station in Barstow, telling of the crash. At first Nellis authorities did not confirm that a military plane was involved. But a casualty convoy was dispatched from the Las Vegas base and the Air Force asked the San Bernardino County Coroners Office to investigate. Chief Dep. Coroner Edward P. Doyle left San Bernardino late last night for the Highway 91 crash site." The C-45 was assigned to the 865th Aircraft Warning Squadron at Nellis. The flight had originated at Luke AFB, Arizona, with March AFB as a stopover.

22 January
A Boeing KC-97 Stratofreighter on a training flight from Westover AFB, Massachusetts to Griffiss AFB, New York, crashes in a densely wooded section in the Adirondack Mountains in northern Herkimer County, about eight miles (13 km) SE of Atwell, New York, killing all seven crew. The tower at Griffiss had directed the tanker on Tuesday night to leave the approach pattern over the field and let another plane land first. There was no further contact. A helicopter spotted the wreckage on 24 January. "At Washington, the Air Force said the following men were aboard the plane: Maj. Charles D. Mellinger, Tacoma; Maj. Roland L. Urquhart, Warwick, R.I.; 1st Lt. Fred V. Defrench, Bedford, Ohio; 1st Lt. Alsia C. Stewart, Palestine, Tex.; Sgt. Raymond E. Noah, Paducah, Ky.; Sgt. Lars I. Bergstrom, West Caldwell, N.J., and Sgt. Joel V. Blackwell, Clairton, Pa." KC-97G, 53-0222, c/n 17004, of the 384th Air Refueling Squadron. is involved.

22 January
A U.S. Navy Douglas R5D-3 Skymaster, BuNo 50869. c/n 10546, carrying a funeral party to NAS Glenview, Illinois, diverts to Willow Run Airport, Michigan, due to bad weather over Illinois. Two minutes from landing, at 21:33, the aircraft strikes the ground on vacant land near a gravel pit in a snowstorm and breaks up as it bounces and decelerates. Six of seven aboard crawl or are pulled from the wreckage. One man, a Coast Guard lieutenant commander, is pronounced dead at the University of Michigan Hospital. The wreckage burns and the casket on board is scorched in the fire. The flight originated at NAS Miramar, California, with an intermediate stop at Albuquerque to pick up the body of a Navy pilot who was recently killed. Cause was thought to be faulty altimeter readings due to a frozen drain in the pitot static system.

24 January
Two Boeing B-47B Stratojets of the 19th Bomb Wing, Homestead AFB, Florida, have mid-air near the Isle of Pines, Cuba, during refueling operations. B-47B-50-BWs, 51-2332, and -2352, collided during an early night operation.

24 January
An F-86D radar training jet on a routine flight crashed southwest of Perrin Air Base in Denison, TX, killing its pilot. The pilot was identified as Air Force Lt. William K. Ryan of Fort Worth, TX.

25 January
The first launch attempt of a Douglas XSM-75 Thor IRBM, 56-6751, vehicle number 101, delivered in October 1956, fails. As vehicle lifts off from Pad LC-17, Cape Canaveral Air Force Station, Florida, it reaches an apogee of 6 inches (150 mm) whereupon contamination destroys a LOX supply valve, causing the engine to lose thrust. The Thor slides backwards through the launch ring and explodes on contact with the thrust deflector. Vehicle destroyed by low-order detonation. Serious pad damage occurs.

25 January
A USAF North American F-86 Sabre goes missing in the Pacific off Guam this date. The pilot is identified on 27 January as 1st Lt. Charles Fair of Indianapolis, Indiana.

25 January
"A jet pilot parachuted to safety this morning as his F86A fighter crashed on the desert five miles (8 km) southeast of Boron. The pilot, 2nd Lt. Jarman A. Lynch, 24, from San Dimas, was not injured, according to a spokesman at nearby Edwards Air Force Base. The Air Force said Lynch bailed out at 7,000 feet (2,134 m) about 09:00 after he lost control of the jet. Lynch of the 196th Fighter Interceptor Squadron of the Air National Guard at Ontario was on a routine flight from Vincent, California to Ontario. Lynch landed close to the plane wreckage."

27 January
Douglas C-124C-DL Globemaster II. 50-0088, c/n 43226, of the 1st Strategic Support Squadron, Strategic Air Command, Biggs Air Force Base, Texas, departs Elmendorf AFB, Alaska, with 13 and a load of cargo aboard, bound for McChord AFB, Washington, and Biggs AFB. An engine catches fire shortly after takeoff and the transport attempts a return to Elmendorf. In heavy fog and freezing temperatures, the pilots crash land at 09:15 AST on the ice of Cook Inlet very close to shore, the aircraft coming down intact. "Rescue operations were completed 55 minutes later by three helicopters of the 31st Air Rescue Squadron, the Air Force public information office at Elmendorf said. None of the men was believed to be in serious condition. Twelve of the men were 'walking' cases, according to Air Force officials."

27 January
Eleven crew successfully bail out of Lockheed P2V-3 Neptune, BuNo 122983, after it develops engine trouble in a snowstorm, over rugged terrain in north central Arizona. Although they jump over a wide area, the seven crew and four passengers are quickly collected by Navajo County sheriff's officers. The bomber comes down and burns at 19:00 ten miles (16 km) north of Joseph City, Arizona. The P2V was returning to NAS Hutchinson, Kansas, from NAS Los Alamitos, California, on a cross-country training flight when it developed an engine fire east of Winslow. Pilot Lt. (jg) Lawrence W. Hansen, of Chanute, feathered the engine, but while already coping with limited visibility began also to pick up ice. He radioed the Civil Aeronautics Administration that he was turning back. When the second engine began to cut out and the plane began to drop, bail-out was ordered at 7,500 feet (2,300 m), 2,500 ft (760 m) above the snowy countryside. An Air Force B-25 in the area got permission to change course and spotted burning wreckage. Sheriff's deputies were dispatched to the scene. Deputy Jim Faucer said it was "by luck" that the crash occurred only a short distance from a seldom-used road near U.S. 66. The only injury was Arthur M. Lueck, 26, first radioman of the crew who received a broken leg. He is in a hospital at Winslow. "Other crew members were: Lt. (jg) Fred L. Geer, 23, student co-pilot, Pontiac, Mich.; Ens. John W. Konvalinka, 23, a student, New Rochelle, N. Y.; Donald P. Marchewka, 21, plane captain and aviation machinists mate 3rd class, Schenectady N. Y.; Joe L. Johnson, 20, airman apprentice, Houston, Tex., and Julius B. Fitzgerald, 34, 2nd radioman, Stillwell. Passengers were Lcdr. Talmadge H. Morrison, 36, Los Angeles, Calif.; Lt. Herbert C. Phelps, 35, Wilton N. Y.; Lt. William J. Fath, 33, Mt. Vernon, N. Y., and Lt. (J.G.) Curtis R. Allen, 34, Atlanta, Ga."

29 January
"HONOLULU UP – The Navy announced that Marine 1st Lt. James Caffey Jr. of Newton Center, Mass., was killed when his AD5N attack bomber crashed and cartwheeled 1,000 feet (300 m) along the runway at the naval air station on Maui."

31 January

A mid-air collision between a non-commercial test flight of DC-7B airliner, N8210H, c/n 45192/764, and a Northrop F-89J Scorpion, 52-1870A, c/n 4447. The Scorpion, coming out of 90-degree turn at 25,000 feet (7,620 m), struck the DC-7B almost head-on at 11:18, severing 8 1/2 feet (2.6 m) of the transport's port wing. The DC-7B continued on a westward heading for about 4 miles (6 km) before breaking up and impacting across the street from a junior high school – flying debris killed three students and injured some 74 others. Following the collision, the radarman aboard the Scorpion ejected, and survived despite serious burns. Pilot Roland E. Owen, 36, died in the burning fighter. The collision was blamed on the failure of both aircraft crews to exercise proper "see and avoid" procedures regarding other aircraft while operating under visual flight rules (VFR). The catastrophe prompted the Civil Aeronautics Board (CAB) to set restrictions on all aircraft test flights, both military and civilian, requiring that they be made over open water or specifically approved sparsely populated areas.

1 February
A Boeing B-47 Stratojet out of Portsmouth Air Force Base, New Hampshire, with four crew aboard, crashes in flames into the Atlantic some nine miles (14 km) off of the fishing port of Gloucester, Massachusetts. Fishermen pick up four life jackets and parts of the plane, but find no survivors. The bomber is reported missing when it fails to return from a routine training flight. Officials at Portsmouth AFB identified three of the crew as Capt. Orrin W. Snyder III, 31; 1st Lt. Stanley D. Jenkins Jr., 28; and Capt. Alexander A. Wawrzyniak.

1 February
"MOUNTAIN VIEW (AP) – An Air Force F84 jet fighter exploded and crashed into a home late yesterday only three blocks from the business section of this San Francisco peninsula community. A woman was rescued from the house. The pilot was killed. The Thunderjet from Luke Field Ariz., bound for Hamilton Air Force Base, was coming in for an emergency landing at nearby Moffett Field, a Navy installation. Luke Field authorities identified the pilot as Capt. Robert Mulvehill, 32, who resided at the air base with his wife. He was on a cross-country training mission. 'I saw the plane coming down from the north,' said W. R. Wollard, Mountain View planning commissioner. 'He was in a pretty steep dive. I thought it was going to pull out but it didn't. There was a big explosion.' The pilot's body was found a block away from the Les Wright residence, which was destroyed. Wright's wife, Opal, 56, jumped out of a window and was pulled to safety before the house went up in flames. Her leg and hip were hurt. The Wright's two children were at high school only 2 blocks away. Flaming fragments of the fighter showered nearby houses, damaging 12 in varying degrees." Republic F-84G-30-RE Thunderjet, 52-3317, of the 3600th Combat Crew Training Wing, was the aircraft destroyed. The pilot was a native of Edinburg, Pennsylvania. "The pilot's body landed in the driveway of 445 Bryant St., the home of Mrs. Ruby Rhett." The jet engine fell into the front yard at 420 Franklin Street, Mountain View.

2 February
Two Boeing KB-29P Superfortresses of three from the 420th Air Refueling Squadron on a weekend training mission out of RAF Sculthorpe, UK, collide in mid-air over Normandy, France, and crash, killing 13, injuring five, with one missing. The collision, at 15,000 ft (4,600 m), occurred in poor visibility when the lead plane lost speed and the second plane, unable to avoid it, plowed into it. Gendarmes said that the wreckage of the two tankers fell to earth about two miles (3 km) apart near the village of Morigny, 20 miles (32 km) from St. Lo. The third KB-29 returned safely to base. One of the injured found shelter in a farmhouse after parachuting. One airman who jumped from the flaming wreckage died from burns after reaching the ground. Two of those hospitalized were only slightly hurt and were said to be in no danger. One of the planes carried a crew of ten, the other nine. Three of the victims were M/Sgt. Lawrence M. Grigory, A2C Arthur B. Kosier, and A3C Franklin D. Schweigert.

2 February
"SAN DIEGO (AP) – A Navy F7U Cutlass jet fighter exploded in flight and crashed on the Camp Matthews Rifle Range north of here yesterday, killing the pilot and setting fire to a shed. William Rudolph, a witness, said he saw the plane make several barrel rolls, straighten out and go into a steep glide at 1,000. [sic] He said he saw the pilot eject, but didn't see the parachute open. Wreckage from the plane scattered over a wide area of the range, setting several small brush fires." The pilot and F7U-3M were assigned to VA-116 at NAS Miramar, California.

2 February
USMC 1st Lt. Ray C. Sorensen, is killed when his Grumman F9F Panther smacks the snowy slopes of 10,064-foot Mt. Baldy in the San Gabriel Mountains while on a training mission out of MCAAS Mojave, California. The body of the pilot is found in the wreckage at the 8,000-foot (2,400 m) level, near Wrightwood. He is survived by his wife, Susanne, and son, Gregory, 3 months, who live at MCAS El Toro, California.

2 February
A USAF North American F-86 Sabre crashes into a hangar on landing at Hanscom Air Force Base, Massachusetts, killing pilot Capt. Gordon E. DeGroat, 31, Nutting Lake, Massachusetts. DeGroat had flown from Bunker Hill AFB, Indiana, in a group of three jets. On his initial landing attempt the landing gear failed to lock down and the pilot aborted to let the tower do a visual check. On the second approach, the left wing dipped and the fighter struck an unoccupied hangar. A blaze broke out but was quickly controlled by fire crews. The hangar was not heavily damaged.

4 February
Two Air Force officers are killed while approaching Moody Air Force Base, Georgia, in a Lockheed T-33. Dead are 1st Lt. James Thomas, 23, the pilot, Tipp City, Ohio, and 1st Lt. Ralph E. Delaney, 23, Los Angeles.

15 February
Two U.S. Navy fliers are killed when their Douglas AD-5 Skyraider goes out of control and crashes on the desert 12 miles (19 km) west of Naval Auxiliary Air Station El Centro, California. The victims were identified as pilot Ens. James R. Benson, 22, of College Park, Georgia, and Aviation Electronicsman 3.C Robert A. Rucinski, 20, Rockford, Illinois.

15 February
Lockheed engineer pilot Joseph "Joe" Watson Ozier, 32, is injured when a Lockheed F-104 Starfighter crashes on landing at United States Air Force Plant 42, Palmdale, California, Lockheed Aircraft spokesmen said the aircraft overturned and caught fire. The accident in JF-104A, 55-2958, c/n 183-1004, proves fatal. Ozier dies late that night from burns and internal injuries.

15 February
A Republic of China Air Force patrol plane returning from a mission over the Taiwan Strait crashes into a row of houses southwest of Taipei, Taiwan, killing all nine crewmen and injuring ten civilians.

15 February
Supermarine Spitfire Tr.IX 163 of the Irish Air Corps crashed whilst performing a touch-and-go at Baldonnel Airfield and was damaged beyond repair. Pilot was uninjured.

20 February
First Fiat G.91 prototype, NC.1, suffers serious problem was the elimination of aeroelastic vibrations, leads to its destruction on this date in a high-speed run at low altitude over Cavour, near Turin, Italy. Test pilot Riccardo Bignamini ejected successfully in a Martin-Baker seat. Although NC.1 was completely destroyed, all the recording equipment which Fiat had installed was salvaged from the crash site. The re-engineering work to cure the problem was very extensive and resulted in the second prototype being fitted with a larger tail, a 6 cm (2 in) higher canopy, a ventral fin and some other modifications.

21 February
A U.S. Navy McDonnell F3H Demon just misses a high school and crashes into a garage in Hertford, North Carolina, killing a mechanic. The pilot's body is found hours later in a field some distance from the wreckage.

21 February
A Martin Matador missile has a mind of its own after launch from Holloman Air Force Base, New Mexico, and heads northwest for points unknown with about an hour of fuel on board. Unarmed, it carries test equipment. It also fails to respond to a destruct command.

22 February
A Douglas C-124 Globemaster II with 159 Americans aboard crashes in the Han River, South Korea. Five were known dead and 20 were unaccounted for. Minutes after departing Kimpo Air Base for Tachikawa Air Base, Japan, the pilot radioed that he had lost his number 3 (starboard inner) engine and was returning to Kimpo. Shortly thereafter the transport came down on a sand bar in the broad Han River. The airframe burned. C-124A-DL, 51-0141, c/n 43475, was involved.

23 February
A Lockheed T-33 Shooting Star went missing over northern Placer County, California. Though it was thought to have gone down around Blue Canyon, neither the wreckage nor its two pilots Capt. Paul Omann of North Highlands, CA and 1st Lt. J.C. Sutton of Craig Air Force Base, Alabama, were found.

28 February
"ENID, Okla. (AP) – A twin-engine Air Force C45 plane crashed and burned on takeoff at Vance Air Force Base here early yesterday, killing two men and seriously injuring another. Vance authorities said the plane was based at Shaw AFB near Sumter, S.C. Names of the plane's three occupants were withheld."

4 March
A USAF Fairchild C-119 Flying Boxcar crashes at night near Columbia Metropolitan Airport, South Carolina, after losing an engine. All twelve aboard parachute safely.

5 March
A Blackburn Beverley, XH117, c/n 1023, of 53 Squadron Royal Air Force crashed on approach to RAF Abingdon, England following engine failure due to fuel starvation. Eighteen occupants killed and two on the ground.

5 March
A Convair T-29, returning to Mather AFB, California, from Kirtland AFB, New Mexico, crashes and burns near El Morro National Monument, New Mexico, six of eleven on board escaping with minor injuries, others receiving burns.

7 March
A Boeing B-47 Stratojet explodes and sets fire to another B-47 at Lake Charles AFB, Louisiana. Two men receive burns and both bombers are destroyed.

8 March
"KANSAS CITY (AP) – A Navy jet yesterday carried its pilot to his death, crashing only 50 yards from a home where a grandfather was babysitting with his 5-year-old grandson. The Olathe, Kan., Naval Air Station identified the pilot as 1st Lt. Samuel M. Kenney, 26, U.S. Marine Corps, an instructor at the base. Survivors include his wife, of Olathe, Kan., and his mother, Mrs. Bessie Kenney, 6243 Satsuma St., North Hollywood, Calif."

14 March
Sikorsky HO4S-3, 55892, c/n 55–892, of the Royal Canadian Navy, ditches off the coast of Key West, Florida. Crew rescued by USS Cromwell.

17 March

The official plane of the President of the Philippines, a Philippine Air Force C-47A-75-DL Skytrain, 42-100925, c/n 19388, named "Mt. Pinatubo", crashes on the slopes of Mount Manunggal, 35 km (21.9 mi) northwest of Cebu, Philippines, at c. 01:40 killing Philippine President Ramon Magsaysay and 24 others. The crash is blamed on metal fatigue – spindle shaft of the starboard engine carburetor snapped causing power loss; one journalist on board survives. See also 1957 Cebu Douglas C-47 crash. This aircraft had been stored at Norton AFB, California from c. 14 February 1951 prior to going to the Philippine Air Force.

22 March
A United States Air Force Boeing C-97C-35-BO Stratofreighter, 50-702, c/n 16246, lost at sea over Pacific Ocean near Japan without trace. 67 died. This remains the worst C-97 accident.

2 April
U.S. Navy Lockheed P2V-6M Neptune departs Naval Auxiliary Air Station Chincoteague (now Wallops Flight Facility), Virginia, in breezy, overcast and rainy conditions, and crashes at c. 06:55 in a potato field on the north side of Nocks Landing Road, about one mile east of Atlantic Road near Powell’s Bay, c. 2 miles south of the base runways, killing all 11 crew. The plane and its crew were on a routine flight to the Navy’s Cherry Point fleet readiness center in North Carolina. KWF were:

Cmdr. Eugene T. Allen, USN, Fairview, Illinois
Lt. Thomas Albert, USN, Chicago, Illinois
John Graves, AM3, Elmont, New York
Harvey Harrison, AD3, Blooming Rose, West Virginia
Charles S. Tucker, AT3, Alexandria, Virginia
Franklin C. Cullari, AN, Newark, New Jersey
William M. Grant, AT1, St. Louis, Missouri
George Stracka, AD1, Sellersville, Pennsylvania
Billy C. Nesson, PH1, Pleasant Shade, Tennessee
Arnon McClellan, AD1, Salt Lake City, Utah
Dale W. Nelson, AD3, Spokane, Washington

4 April
CIA Lockheed U-2, Article 341, (no military serial), the first U-2, is lost in a crash north of the Nevada Test Range during a Project Rainbow test flight, killing test pilot Bob Sieker. Engine fails at 65,000 feet (20,000 m). As pilot's pressure suit inflates, the faceplate clasp fails, pilot suffers hypoxia, loses consciousness. Aircraft goes into descending flat spin. Pilot recovers somewhat at lower altitude and bails out, but too late – parachute does not have time to fully deploy. Airframe hits flat with only small fire. Crash site, 40 miles (64 km) north of the Ranch, takes four days to find by air. Pilot and aircraft are only 200 feet (61 m) apart. Kelly Johnson calls for new faceplate design, a dual oxygen regulator, and an ejection seat that can be used interchangeably with existing design.

17 April

The left-hand wing of a Royal Air Force Vickers Valetta C.1, VW832, fails during flight 25 miles (40 km) northeast of Aqaba, Jordan at an estimated altitude of 5,000 feet (1,500 m); the transport's 24 passengers and 3 crew, all British servicemen, perish in the ensuing crash. The accident is attributed to structural failure caused by the imposition of loads in excess of the wing's design strength; the suspected cause is the pilot's attempt to recover from a loss of control in severe clear-air turbulence.

25 April
Northrop SM-64 Navaho, 53-8272, falls back onto launchpad at Cape Canaveral, Florida, a few seconds after liftoff and explodes.

9 May
1st Lt. David Steeves departs Hamilton AFB, California for Craig AFB, Alabama, in T-33A-1-LO Shooting Star, 52-9232, and disappears without a trace. Declared dead by the Air Force, he emerges from the Kings Canyon National Park in the Sierra Nevada mountains 54 days later, having ejected from the jet after an in-flight emergency. He stumbled on a ranger cabin during his ordeal where he found fish hooks, a canned ham and a can of beans. Unable to locate the downed trainer, officials eye him with suspicion and rumors that he traded to jet to the Russians, or flew it to Mexico, dog the pilot and ruin his military career. He returns to civilian life and eventually dies in an aircraft accident in 1965. Finally, in 1977, Boy Scouts hiking in the national park discover the canopy of his T-33, too late to vindicate the pilot's story and reputation.

9 May
Boeing KC-97F-55-BO Stratofreighter, 51-0258, c/n 16325, en route from Sidi Slimane Air Base, Morocco, to Lajes Field, Terceira Island, Azores, ditches at 06:16 in the Atlantic 550 km (343.8 mls) SE of the Azores Islands following a double engine failure, no fatalities amongst the seven crew. The airplane floated for ten days and was sunk by USS Wisconsin.

14 May
A Royal Canadian Navy McDonnell F2H-3 Banshee, BuNo 126310 of VF-871, strikes a hilltop during ground-attack exercises near Terence Bay, Nova Scotia, killing pilot SubLt. Conrad Bissett.

15 May
During the first test flight of the Russian R-7 Semyorka (Russian: Р-7 «Семёрка»), (GRAU index 8K71) vehicle M1-5, the world's first intercontinental ballistic missile, from Baikonur Cosmodrome, Kazakhstan, a fire in a strap-on rocket leads to a catastrophic failure 90 seconds into the flight and an unintended crash 400 km (250 mi) from the launch site. The accident was caused by a ruptured fuel pipeline.

21 May
First Sud-Aviation (Sud-Ouest) SO.9050 Trident II -001, rocket-powered short-range interceptor, is destroyed during a test-flight out of Centre d'Essais en Vol (Flight Test Center) when its highly volatile fuels, Furaline and nitric acid, accidentally mix and explode, killing test pilot Charles Goujon. Project is discontinued following this accident.

22 May
A U.S. Air Force B-36J-5-CF Peacemaker, 52-2816, (c/n 372), ferrying a Mark 17 nuclear bomb from Biggs AFB, Texas to Kirtland AFB, New Mexico, accidentally drops it through closed bomb doors, impacting 4.5 miles (7.2 km) south of Kirtland tower. High explosives detonate creating crater 25 ft × 12 ft (7.6 m × 3.7 m), but no fuel capsule fitted, no injuries.

29 May
A Grumman F6F-5K Hellcat drone out of Naval Air Station China Lake, California, breaks contact with both its mother aircraft and the ground and flies nearly 1,000 miles (1,600 km) north at 250 mph (400 km/h) at 20,000 ft (6,100 m). It dived through a dense thundercloud thus preventing two "shoot down" planes from following it. Finally out of fuel, it crashes into a knoll in a wheat field just west of Colfax, Washington, digging a small crater and throwing scattered wreckage about. The drone ended its solo flight about 50 miles south of Spokane after passing over California, Nevada and Oregon. It hit about a quarter of a mile from a farmhouse and burned.

31 May
A Royal Canadian Navy McDonnell F2H-3 Banshee fighter jet, BuNo 126313, Sqn. No. 104 of VF-870, spirals out of control after its right wing breaks in half during a high-speed flyby at naval air station HMCS Shearwater, Nova Scotia, Canada. The canopy is observed to separate from the aircraft, but the pilot, Lt. Derek Prout, fails to eject and is killed when the plane slams into McNabs Island. The crash is attributed to improperly manufactured fittings in the folding wing mechanism, and most RCN and US Navy Banshees are grounded until improved fittings can be installed.

4 June
World War II Japanese ace Maj. Teruhiko Kobayashi (1920–1957), flying with the reconstituted Japanese Self-Defense Air Force, is killed in the crash of a Lockheed T-33A Shooting Star during a training flight when he crashes in bad weather on approach to Hamamatsu Air Base. He ordered his back-seater to eject when the aircraft developed problems. He had shot down three Boeing B-29 Superfortress bombers and two Grumman F6F Hellcats with the 244th Sentai, although his widow claimed he had twice the number of Superfortress kills, a claim discounted by historian Takashi Sakurai.

7 June
Chance Vought Aircraft pilot James P. Buckner, 32, is killed while performing a high-speed flyby of CVA's tower at Hensley Field, Dallas, Texas, while demonstrating a Vought F8U-1 Crusader for a graduating class from the Navy Post Graduate School there. Executing a zoom climb after his low-altitude pass, he apparently overstresses the fighter and it disintegrates before he can eject. The aircraft's wreckage violently explodes at low altitude over Main Street in adjacent Grand Prairie, Texas, causing minor injuries to several bystanders, and pieces of the fighter are scattered throughout the floodplain of the nearby Trinity River; Buckner's body is recovered a few hours after the crash.

8 June
Royal Canadian Air Force Avro Canada CF-100 Mk.5, 18562, of No. 433 Squadron, North Bay, separated both wings during performance at London, Ontario, air show sustaining two fatalities. F/O's C.A. Sheffield and Les Sparrow died in the crash. Post crash film analysis suggested that the aircraft pulled +7 g's while configured for a maximum of +4.74 g.

28 June
In two separate accidents, two newly delivered Lockheed U-2s of the SAC's 4028th Strategic Reconnaissance Squadron based at Laughlin Air Force Base, Del Rio, Texas, are lost on the same day. At 08:55 Lt. Ford Lowcock is killed when his aircraft, U-2A 56-6699, Article 366, crashes while on the approach to Laughlin. Less than two hours later, Lt. Leo Smith is also killed when his aircraft, U-2C 56-6702, Article 369, crashes in the New Mexico desert. At this time U-2s are not equipped with ejection seats to save weight, but at around this point this policy is reversed. Three months later on 26 September, the squadron's Commanding Officer, Col. Jack Nole climbs out of his disabled U-2A, 56-6694, Article 361, the first airframe of the initial USAF order, (wing flaps deployed in flight) near Del Rio, Texas, making the highest ever parachute escape to date, from 53,000 feet.

11 July
First Lockheed F-104 Starfighter prototype, XF-104-LO, 53-7786, c/n 1001, with Lockheed test pilot Bill Park flying chase on an F-104A flown by Bob Matye during a tail flutter test, loses empennage in high speed, low altitude flight, successfully ejects using downward ejection seat. The XF-104 had a lower limit Mach than the F-104A and apparently reached the flutter limit sooner than A-model.

12 July
After missing a scheduled 11 June launch date due to defective engines in the missile's central section, a Russian R-7 Semyorka (Russian: Р-7 «Семёрка»), (GRAU index 8K71) lifts off from Baikonur Cosmodrome, Kazakhstan, but loses its in-flight stability in the 33rd second of flight and starts to deviate from its preset trajectory. "This particular malfunction was caused by a short-circuited integrator responsible for the missile’s revolution."

18 July
The 380th Bomb Wing suffers its first peacetime major accident when Boeing KC-97G-28-BO Stratofreighter, 52-2737, c/n 16768, from the 380th Air Refueling Squadron with a crew of eight explodes and crashes into Lake Champlain at 21:28 when two of the four engines fail three minutes after take-off from Plattsburgh AFB, New York. Three survivors.

Also on 18 July 1957, a T-33 trainer jet from the New Hampshire Air National Guard crashed into the front yard of a home on Forest Street in Worcester, Massachusetts. The jet had taken off from Grenier Air Force Base in Manchester, New Hampshire, for a routine training exercise and exploded upon impact, resulting in the deaths of both crew members: First lieutenant Lawrence C. Guild and Captain John F. Murphy Jr. The crash caused significant damage to several nearby homes, although no individuals on the ground were injured. Eyewitnesses described the plane's sudden spin and the subsequent explosion, which spread flaming debris and fuel across the neighborhood. The community quickly mobilized to help those affected, with neighbors using garden hoses to control the fires and prevent further damage.

28 July
Two Mark 5 nuclear bombs without nuclear capsules installed were jettisoned from a Douglas C-124 Globemaster II in the Atlantic Ocean c. 100 miles (160 km) SE of Naval Air Station Pomona, New Jersey, just outside Delaware Bay east of Rehoboth Beach, Delaware, and south of Wildwood and Cape May, New Jersey. The aircraft was carrying three weapons and one nuclear capsule; the weapons were in Complete Assembly for Ferry (CAF) condition. Nuclear components were not installed; power supplies were installed but not connected. The C-124 was en route from Dover AFB, Delaware, to Europe via the Azores islands when its two port engines lost power. Maximum power was applied to the two starboard engines, however, level flight could not be maintained. The crew decided to jettison one weapon at an altitude of 4,500 feet (1,400 m) c. 75 miles (121 km) off the coast of New Jersey. The second weapon was jettisoned soon afterwards at an altitude of 2,500 feet (760 m) at a distance of 50 miles (80 km) from the New Jersey coast. No detonation was seen to occur from either weapon, and both bombs were presumed to have been damaged or destroyed on impact with the sea and to have sunk almost instantly. The C-124 landed at an airfield in the vicinity of Atlantic City, New Jersey (probably Naval Air Station Atlantic City), with the remaining weapon and the nuclear capsule aboard. After a three-month long search, neither the weapons nor any debris were located. By November 1957, the AEC was taking action to issue replacement weapons to the DOD. No public announcement of this incident was made at the time it happened.

8 August
Mikoyan-Gurevich Ye-50, a swept-wing, experimental high-altitude interceptor, the Ye-2 airframe modified to fit Dushkin S-155 rocket motor, with design work started in 1954, first flight in 1956. Programme terminated after crash of Ye-50/3 on this date. Test pilot N. A. Korovin, of GK NII VVS, is killed when the engine explodes, escape system fails.

17 August
A B-25 Mitchell medium bomber assigned to Vance Air Force Base, Enid, Oklahoma, crashes into a housing project near Palm Beach Air Force Base in Palm Beach, Florida, at c. 03:00 just prior to landing on the final leg of a training flight. The four-man crew are KWF. The crew were 1st Lt. Robert E. DeTroye, of San Luis Obispo, California; 1st Lt. John Jones, 27, Muncie, Indiana; 1st Lt. James E. Brookman, Mount Vernon, Illinois; and 2nd Lt. James A. Ewalt, Northwoods, Missouri. All of the men were unmarried, it was announced.

27 August
A Royal Canadian Navy McDonnell F2H-3 Banshee fighter jet, BuNo 126306, Sqn. No. 103 of VF-870, collides on a runway with an RCN General Motors TBM-3E Avenger, BuNo 53358, of squadron VC-921, at naval air station HMCS Shearwater, Nova Scotia, Canada. A flight of 3 Avengers was cleared for a formation takeoff on Runway 20 while the Banshee was performing touch-and-go landings on intersecting Runway 16. Due to an inoperable radio, Lt. Ed Trzcinski, Banshee pilot and U.S. Navy exchange officer, did not hear instructions from the control tower to go around, and apparently did not see red flares launched from the control tower due to patchy fog over the airfield and a possible lack of situational awareness. The Banshee collided with the second Avenger, killing Trzcinski and SubLt. Julian Freeman, RCN, pilot and sole occupant of the Avenger.

31 August
USAF Douglas C-124C Globemaster II, 52-1021, operated by the 1st Strategic Squadron, crashes while on an instrument approach to Biggs Air Force Base in El Paso, Texas, USA, in bad weather after a flight from Hunter AFB near Savannah, Georgia, USA. 5 aircrew are killed, 10 injured.

4 September
Douglas C-124A Globemaster II, 51-5173, c/n 43583, en route from Larson AFB, Washington, crashed while attempting a landing at Binghamton Airport, Binghamton, New York. On final approach, just before touchdown, the airplane struck an embankment and crashed on the runway. The plane was delivering 20 tons of equipment for Link Aviation. The crew of 9 survived.

5 September
Royal Canadian Air Force Avro Canada CF-100 Mk.4B, 18455, pulled up, flamed out, went into inverted spin and at the Canadian International Air Show, Toronto, Ontario. W/C H. R. Norris and F/O R. C. Dougall were killed.

24 September
U. S. Air Force Major James Melancon, 36, of Dallas, Texas, is killed when the Douglas B-26 Invader he was piloting crashes in a residential area near Dayton, Ohio, at 16:59. Coming down at 1843 Tuttle Avenue, the flight, out of Wright Field, strikes a home, killing the pilot, co-pilot Capt. Wilho R. Heikkinen, 31, and two on the ground, and injuring others. Mildred VanZant, 44, an assistant director of nursing at St. Elizabeth Hospital, was killed when the plane impacted her house. Her brother Walter Geisler, 53, was mowing the lawn behind the house when he was killed. Four houses were struck by wreckage and two were set alight. An investigation determined that a loose engine cowling moved forward into the propeller. The pilot's son, Mark E. Melancon, will die in the Thunderbirds demonstration team Diamond Crash in Nevada in 1982.

26 September

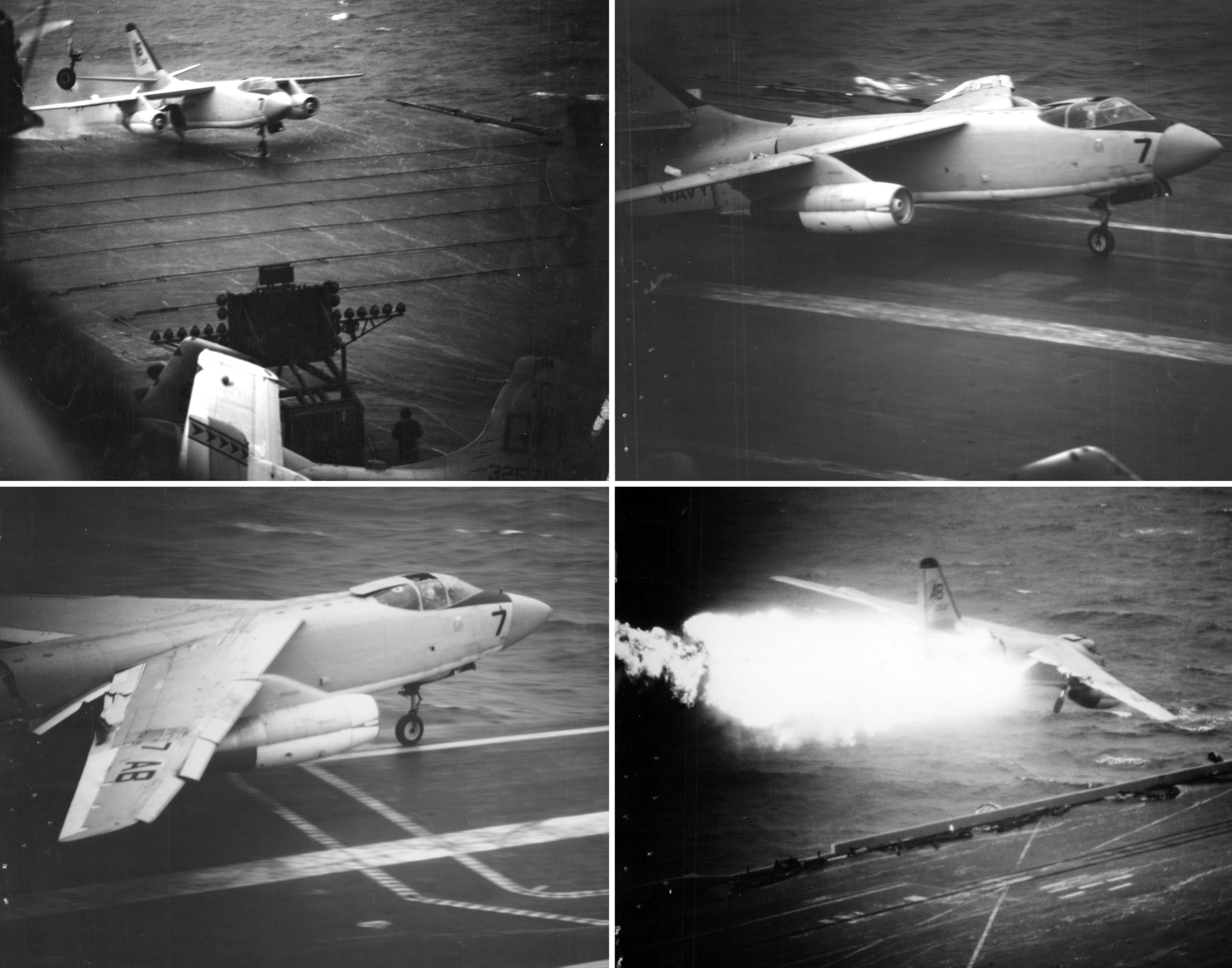
A3D-1 crash on USS Forrestal (CVA-59).

US Navy Douglas A3D-1 Skywarrior, BuNo 135417, 'AB 7', of Heavy Attack Squadron ONE (VAH-1) crashes on the deck of the aircraft carrier USS Forrestal (CVA-59) during Operation Strikeback in the Norwegian Sea. It was a day landing, second approach, CCA (first approach mode one without); 1.6 km visibility, low, ragged ceiling, intermittent rain showers. After a low approach the aircraft settled at the ramp and the mainmounts and fuselage struck the ramp. The aircraft continued up the deck in flames, crashing off angle. Parts of the plane struck a parked Douglas AD-5N Skyraider. Only two helmets and one boot were later recovered. It was estimated that one possible contributing factor was that the rain caused the optical illusion of "high ball" (on the landing mirror), combined with low airspeed. This was a fatal mishap for all crewmembers: Pilot, CDR Paul Wilson (71 total carrier landings); Bombardier/Navigator, LTJG Joseph R. Juricic; and third crew member, ADC Percy Schafer. As a sea-based high altitude bomber, the A3D was not equipped with ejection seats in order to save weight for operations from aircraft carriers.

1 October
Aborted takeoff at Homestead AFB, Florida, causes write-off of Boeing B-47B-50-BW Stratojet, 51-2317, of the 379th Bomb Wing. Gear collapses, aircraft burns, but base fire department is able to quench flames such that crew escapes – pilots blow canopy to get out, navigator egresses through his escape hatch.

2 October
A Royal Canadian Navy McDonnell F2H-3 Banshee, BuNo 126403 of VF-870, suffers flight control problems during carrier qualifications on HMCS Bonaventure (CVL 22) off southeast coast of Nova Scotia. Commanders order pilot Lt. Howard Cooper to return to naval air station HMCS Shearwater, Nova Scotia 30 mi (48 km) north for repairs, but Cooper flies out to sea and runs out of fuel; a second Banshee pilot had determined the errant aircraft's approximate heading by tracking Cooper's radio signals, but the missing aircraft and pilot are not found after 4 days of intensive searching. On 2 June 1964, Canadian fishing trawler Barbara Dawn snags a wrecked jet in her nets 70 mi (113 km) southwest of Sable Island; fishermen briefly observe entire aircraft before forward half breaks off and sinks, tail section is recovered, and RCN investigators are able to identify wreckage as 126403 based on serial-numbered parts.

9 October
Boeing DB-47B-35-BW Stratojet, 51-2177A, of the 447th Bomb Squadron, 321st Bomb Wing, taking part in a practice demonstration at Pinecastle Air Force Base suffers wing-failure during the annual Strategic Air Command Bombing Navigation and Reconnaissance Competition. The aircraft comes down north of downtown Orlando killing pilot Colonel Michael N. W. McCoy, commander of the 321st Bombardment Wing, Group Captain John Woodroffe of the Royal Air Force, Lieutenant Colonel Charles Joyce, and Major Vernon Stuff. Pinecastle AFB is renamed McCoy Air Force Base in McCoy's honor on 7 May 1958. Details of the accident remained classified for five decades, presumably because they would reveal flaws in the aircraft, but an FOIA request resulted in the release that showed that the investigation laid the blame on pilot McCoy.

11 October
On takeoff shortly after 00:00 from Homestead AFB, Florida, a Boeing B-47B-35-BW Stratojet, 51-2139, c/n 450192, of the 379th Bomb Wing, participating in exercise Dark Night, suffers port-rear wheel casing failure at 30 kn. The bomber's tail hits the runway and a fuel tank ruptures, crashing in an uninhabited area approximately 3,800 feet from the end of the runway, four crew KWF. The aircraft burns for seven hours after the firecrew evacuates the area, ten minutes after the crash. The aircraft was carrying an unarmed nuclear weapon in the bomb bay and fuel capsule in a carrying case in the cabin. "Two low order detonations occurred during the burning." The nuclear capsule and its carrying case were recovered intact and only slightly damaged by heat. Approximately one-half of the weapon remained. All major components were damaged but were identifiable and accounted for.

29 October
Boeing KC-97G-27-BO Stratofreighter, 52-2711, c/n 16742, of the 509th Bomb Wing, out of Walker AFB, New Mexico, crashes 35 miles north of Flagstaff, Arizona, while on nine-hour low-level survey flight to determine minimum altitude restrictions for B-47 training routes. Aircraft was seen over Gray Mountain, Arizona, at altitude of 60 feet shortly after 08:30, and then heard striking a cloud-shrouded cliff face, killing 16 crew and strewing wreckage for 200 yards along mountainside.

30 October

DAVID King Hutchins was the pilot of a plane which was reported missing in the Adriatic Sea area on October 30. His Skyraider plane, which took off from the carrier Randolph at O4:00 that day, was due back at 13:00 that afternoon.

9 November
A Convair RB-36H-10-CF Peacemaker, 51-5745, of the 71st Strategic Reconnaissance Wing, is destroyed by an explosion and groundfire at Ramey AFB, Puerto Rico, all crew members survive. This is the 32nd B-36 written-off in an accident of 385 built and will be the last operational loss before the type is retired.

15 November
USAF Boeing TB-29-75-BW Superfortress, 44-70039, c/n 10871, of the 5040th Radar Evaluation Flight, 5040th Consolidation Maintenance Group, Elmendorf AFB, Alaska, crashed 39 miles (63 km) SE of Talkeetna, Alaska at c. 18:22. Mission departed Elmendorf on a ground radar calibration mission at 0954 under instrument flight rules on flight path to the Aircraft Control and Warning radar stations at Campion near Galena and then Murphy Dome, north of Fairbanks. Flight covered 1,800 nmi (3,300 km). with c. ten hours in the air. Superfortress had fourteen hours' fuel and a crew of eight plus an instructor pilot. On final leg of approach to Elmendorf, bomber came down on glacier now known as "Bomber Glacier", three crew with major injuries and one with a minor injury later upgraded to major, others KWF. Due to remoteness of crashsite, wreckage is still there.

28 November
Second of three flying prototypes of the ultra long-range, high-altitude single-seat super interceptor Lavochkin La-250, is written off in landing crash, in part due to the restricted view from the cockpit over the very long nose. Third prototype will have its nose dropped by six degrees to improve visibility.

28 November
Lockheed U-2A, 56-6704, Article 371, eleventh airframe of first USAF order, delivered April 1957, moved to 4080th Strategic Reconnaissance Wing, Laughlin AFB, Texas, June: 1957, crashes at night this date. Capt. Benny Lacombe killed when he unsuccessfully attempts to bail out of crippled aircraft 13 miles SE of Laughlin. Ejection seats had not yet been fitted to U-2s at this point.

6 December
The first launch attempt of the first all-up three-stage Vanguard rocket, Vanguard TV3, developed by the Naval Research Laboratory, from Cape Canaveral Air Force Station Launch Complex 18, Florida, fails as the vehicle reaches an apogee of c. four feet (1.2 meters), then suffers a loss of thrust, fails back onto the pad, the fuel tanks rupture and explode, destroying the rocket and severely damaging the launchpad. The 1.36 kilogram satellite is thrown clear, landing near the pad, whereupon it begins transmitting a signal. No exact cause for the failure is determined, but the commonly accepted explanation is that low fuel tank pressure during the start procedure allowed some of the burning fuel in the combustion chamber to leak into the fuel system through the injector head before full propellant pressure was obtained from the turbopump. The press dubs the failed attempt "Kaputnik". The satellite is now on display at the National Air and Space Museum, Washington, D.C.

12 December
A U.S. Air Force Boeing B-52D Stratofortress, 56-0597 of the 92d Bomb Wing, crashes at either c. 16:02 PDT or 17:00. on takeoff at Fairchild AFB near Spokane, Washington. All crew members are killed except the tail gunner. The incident is caused by trim motors that were hooked up backwards. The aircraft climbed straight up, stalled, fell over backwards and nosed straight down. Among the dead crewmen was the commanding officer of the SAC 92d Bomb Wing to which the aircraft was assigned, Col. Clarence Arthur Neely, 42, of Rockford, Illinois. The tail section broke away in the crash and the gunner, T/Sgt. Gene I. Graye, 25, Augusta, Kansas, survived a low-level ejection, relatively unscathed. All eight others on board perished, although four attempted ejection. Wreckage was strewn over a radius of more than 1,000 feet (300 m) in a stubble field about a mile west of the airbase. One source states that the crash site was "in a field between the runway (05) and the hospital". Although the Air Force has never indicated whether or not nuclear weapons were aboard the aircraft, this crash was cited in a February 1991 EPA report as having involved nuclear materials This was the seventh B-52 to be lost, and the first that was not serving with a training wing. Also KWF were: Maj. Ralph Romaine Alworth, 38, Oilton, Oklahoma; Capt. Douglas Earl Gray, 33, Guthrie, Kentucky; 1st Lt. James Dennis Mann, 33, Mountain View, California; Capt. Thomas N. Peebles, 33, Carson, Virginia; Capt. Douglas Franklin Schwartz, 37, Minneapolis, Minnesota; Capt. Herbert Henry Spiller Jr., 32, Lowell, Arkansas; and 1st Lt. Jack Joseph Vainisi, 26, of Oakhill, Illinois.

18 December
A B-47 Stratojet bomber crashed on the grounds of the Palomar Observatory in San Diego County, California, killing the plane's crew.

== 1958 ==
6 January
A U.S. Navy Martin P4M-1Q Mercator, BuNo 124373, of JQ-3, JQ tailcode, with 12 aboard, loses power in its port reciprocating engine while on final approach to NAS Norfolk, Virginia, comes down at 22nd Bay Street and East Ocean View Avenue in Ocean View, "demolishing three small houses and damaging three others. The plane and the last house it struck burned. Four of the airmen were unaccounted for. The eight survivors, of whom only one was seriously injured, were hospitalized. All were suffering from shock. Three civilians – occupants of three of the houses that were struck – were injured, none critically," stated the Associated Press. The aircraft was on a ferry flight from its base at Port Lyautey, French Morocco, via Bermuda, to NAS Norfolk, and had entered the landing pattern when the port engine failed, the pilot, Cmdr. Clyde Curley, 41, reported to Navy officials.

14 January
A U.S. Navy Lockheed R7V-1 Super Constellation, BuNo 128437, c/n 1049B-4104, of VW-11, NS Argentia, Newfoundland, practicing instrument landings at NAS Patuxent River, Maryland, is waved off during an 08:30 approach in what the Associated Press terms "murky weather", crashes into a wooded area and explodes, killing all nine aboard. The pilot "had tried to land once before but was waved off because [his] approach to the end of the runway was too low. Visibility was reduced to about a half mile by fog and mist. On the second run, the plane also came in too low and to the left. The tower again waved it off. The pilot gunned his ship as it started over the 'Cinder Block,' the station's name for a housing area for married enlisted personnel. Mrs. Howard Snyder, in one of the one-story, two family buildings, said, 'I looked out the window and all I saw was wings.' The plane cleared the housing area, but clipped treetops as the engines roared. The impact with the trees threw the plane out of control, and it seared a strip through the thin woods a quarter-mile long. Then it struck the ground and erupted into a huge ball of fire. Eight bodies were thrown clear of the wreckage by the exploding gasoline. A ninth was pulled out of the mangled cockpit section while it still smouldered. Of the nine killed, three were officers and six were seamen. A Patuxent spokesman said Cdr. William W. Lamer Jr., of Charleston, S. C., was the plane commander, while Cdr. Richard H. Hart of Natchitoches, La., and Lt. (j.g.) Harry G. Morgan Jr., of Little Ferry N.J., were pilots in training. The spokesman said it was not known which man was at the controls at the time of the crash." Victims included:

Cmdr. Lamar Jr., husband of Mrs. Eva C. Lamar, now living at Patuxent, and son of Capt. and Mrs. William W. Lamar, Charleston, S.C.
Cmdr. Hart, husband of Mrs. Thelma E. Hart, now living at Patuxent, and son of Simon M. Hart, Natchitoches, La.
Seaman Floyd O. Taylor, husband of Mrs. Kathleen Henrickson Taylor, Lexington Md., and son of Mrs. Velma Dowdy, Los Angeles.
Seaman William C. Thurau, husband of Mrs. Mary Lee Seward Thurau, South Hill Va., and son of Mrs. William S. Thurau, Flint Mich.

15 January
A U.S. Air Force Boeing WB-50D Superfortress weather reconnaissance plane, 49–295, c/n 16071, (built as a B-50D-115-BO Superfortress), of the 54th Weather Reconnaissance Squadron, stationed on Guam, with ten crew on board (some sources incorrectly state that there were nine crew), vanishes as it penetrates the eye of Typhoon Ophelia. The bomber was last heard from as it headed towards the typhoon, 600 miles north of Guam. Rescue efforts continued on 18 January after reports of flares, faint radio signals, and mirror flashes. The ammunition ship USS Firedrake reported sighting flares in the search area. "The navy destroyer escort USS Moore and an air rescue squadron plane both reported hearing a radio distress call, possibly from a hand-operated radio such as those carried by the missing craft. In Honolulu a naval officer told of seeing a series of flashes on the water yesterday. He was a passenger on a MATS plane 200 miles west of Guam. Lt. Comdr. Wendell K. Howard said he thought they were mirror flashes but did not report them at the time because he hadn't known the plane was down." No additional evidence of the WB-50 was reported during the following week, when a Military Air Transport Service Boeing C-97 Stratofreighter disappeared southwest of Oahu on a flight to Kwajalein on 19 January, adding to the search complexities for those seeking evidence of the missing weather plane. The search for survivors of the C-97 is abandoned on Wednesday night, 22 January, when a half-ton of aircraft debris is returned to Pearl Harbor, much of it damaged by fire. However, the navy continued to search for survivors of the lost WB-50 after faint radio signals of a type that could have come from a hand-cranked radio on a raft were again heard on 22 January. The following crew were switched from "missing" to "dead" on 20 February:
Aircraft Commander- Captain Albert J Lauer AO 2095765
Pilot- Captain Clyde W Tefertiller AO 751488
Weather Observer- Captain Marcus G Miller AO 751488
Navigator- First Lieutenant Courtland Beeler III AO 2210728
Navigator- First Lieutenant Paul J Buerkle Jr AO3053321
Flight Engineer- Technical Sergeant De1ivan L Gordon AF 57625218
Flight Engineer- Staff Sergeant Kenneth L Tetzloff AFl7336278
Radio Operator- Staff Sergeant Kenneth L Houseman AF 17319484
Radio Operator- Airman First Class Randolph C Watts AF 14382160
Weather Technician- Airman First Class Bernard G Tullgren

18 January
A U.S. Navy Douglas R6D-1 Liftmaster crashes and burns, moments after take off from Kadena Air Base, Naha, Okinawa, but all 35 on board survive. Two were burned, and were taken to Ryukyus Army Hospital. Their names were withheld. As the transport departed Kadena it suffered a failed engine. "The plane faltered, headed down, and struck a hillside, a mile from the runway."

19 January
A U.S. Air Force Boeing C-97A-BO, 49-2597, c/n 16219, probably assigned to the 47th Air Transport Squadron, of the Military Air Transport Service, disappears over the Pacific during a flight from Honolulu to Kwajalein. Pieces of wood and foam rubber were found on Monday night, 20 January, pinpointing where the cargo plane vanished Sunday with seven aboard. The plane was last heard from 385 miles southwest of Oahu Island. The carrier USS Philippine Sea (CV-47) messaged Navy headquarters at Pearl Harbor that it had found the wreckage and believed it came from the cargo plane. "Hope of finding any survivors in the crash of a C95 [sic] Military Air Transport Stratocruiser [sic] waned today (22 January 1958) and the Navy withdrew most of the ships searching the area southwest of Hawaii. Seven men were aboard the four-engine plane, Col. Darlene Bailey of the 1501st Air Transport Wing, Travis Air Force Base, Calif., said here last night chances of finding any of them were 'pretty hopeless.' The navy confirmed that debris found 277 miles to the southwest was wreckage of the plane. It apparently crashed Sunday on a flight to Kwajalein." The search for survivors of the C-97 is abandoned on Wednesday night, 22 January, when a half-ton of aircraft debris is returned to Pearl Harbor, much of damaged by fire. The flight had originated at Travis AFB, California, bound for Tokyo, with fuel stops at Hickam AFB, Hawaii, and Wake Island.

21 January
The last of the seven Finnish Fokker C.Xs that survived World War II crashes in 1958. The airframe, FK-111, served as a target-towing craft in the Finnish Air Force. The plane crashed into a forest this date, killing the pilot, Second Lieutenant Aimo Allinen, and the winch-operator 2d Ltn. Antti Kukkonen.

24 January
"Fuchu, Japan (AP) – Three U.S. Air Force F84G jet trainers [sic] crashed into the sea tonight after takeoff from Iwakuni air base, [sic] western Japan. The bodies of the three pilots, whose names were withheld, had not been located five hours later, the Air Force said. The planes, from the 418th Fighter Training Squadron, Misawa Air Base, were on a training flight. 'Engines of all three aircraft appeared to flame out almost simultaneously on takeoff. The planes hit the water about 1,000 feet from the end of the runway,' the Air Force said." According to Joe Baugher, F-84G-20-RE, 51-1237, had a mid-air collision with flight mates F-84G-25-RE, 51–1300 and F-84G-25-RE, 51-1312, during the takeoff sequence.

24 January
A U.S. Navy Convair R3Y-1 Tradewind, BuNo 128446, "Indian Ocean Tradewind", assigned to VR-2, claims a new Honolulu-Alameda speed record for seaplanes, despite the loss of one engine en route. The Navy said that the Tradewind's 5 hours and 54 minutes bettered an old record for a seaplane, also set by a Tradewind, at 6 hours and 54 minutes. After departing from Keehi Lagoon, Hawaii, the Tradewind suffered the loss of the number one propeller (port outer) when it tore loose about 350 miles (560 km) from the mainland, slashing a six- to eight-foot hole (2.5 m) in the hull below the waterline, and damaging electrical control lines. None of the 17 on board were injured, either, when the R3Y slammed into the breakwater after landing in San Francisco Bay, California, due to a runaway turboprop engine that would not respond to control inputs due to the electrical system damage from the propeller strike. Lt. Cdr. Homer C. Ragsdale was the pilot on this flight. The Navy announces on 30 January that all three R3Y Tradewinds will remain grounded until a five-man accident board can determine what caused the crash of a fourth when it struck a seawall at Naval Air Station Alameda, California, after also losing a propeller in flight. Ultimately, this was the last straw for the troubled P5Y and R3Y programme. Four of the design had crashed, including one of two XP5Y-1 prototypes, all attributed to on-going issues with the problematic Allison T-40 turboprop powerplants and their associated gearboxes. The Navy abandoned further interest in the engine and all aircraft using it. VR-2 was disestablished 16 April 1958, and all P5Y and R3Y airframes broken up.

31 January
During simulated Strategic take-off from Sidi Slimane Air Base, French Morocco, a USAF Boeing B-47E-25-LM Stratojet, 52-0242, of the 368th Bomb Squadron, 306th Bomb Wing, MacDill AFB, Florida, suffers failure of left-rear landing gear casting, tail strikes ground, rupturing fuel tank. Aircraft burns for seven hours. Fortunately, Mk. 36, Mod 1 TN nuclear weapon on board, in strike configuration, does not detonate, although weapon burns to slag within the confines of the wreckage.

31 January
"George Air Force Base, Calif., Jan. 31 (AP) – Two propeller-driven B-26 medium bombers collided over the Southern California desert today. The Air Force said one crashed, killing its two-man crew. The other plane limped 75 miles with one of its two engines feathered and made a belly landing here on a foam-covered runway. Base officials said the crew escaped injury. Names of the dead were withheld pending notification of relatives." Douglas TB-26B Invader, 41-39310, c/n 7023, built as an A-26B-25-DL, crashed 14 miles NNE of Bagdad, California, killing pilot 1st Lt. Alexander Aros and A/1C Patrick Hughes.

1 February
A USAF Douglas C-118A Liftmaster military transport, 53-3277, c/n 44648/602, of the 1611th ATW, based at McGuire AFB, New Jersey, and a United States Navy Lockheed P2V-5F Neptune patrol bomber, BuNo 127723, '7L 203', collided over Norwalk, California (a suburb of Los Angeles) at 19:13. The C-118 had departed Long Beach Municipal Airport for a flight to McGuire AFB, while the P2V had just departed Naval Air Reserve Station Los Alamitos on a training flight with eight Reservists on board. The C-118 disintegrated and the tail section crashed through the roof of a service station, while wreckage fell into the parking lot of the Norwalk Sheriff's Station, setting a gasoline supply dump alight. The Neptune crashed into an excavated clay pit on Norwalk Boulevard. 47 servicemen were killed (35 passengers and six crew aboard the transport, six of eight on the P2V – one more survived the impact but died later) as well as a 23-year-old civilian woman on the ground who was hit by falling debris. A plaque commemorating the disaster was erected by American Legion Post 359 in 1961 at the location of the accident, the corner of Firestone Boulevard and Pioneer Boulevard.

3 February
Two North American F-86 Sabres engaged in a mock attack maneuver collide near Andrews, South Carolina, killing one pilot and forcing the second, First Lieutenant Raymond G. Bronk, to parachute to safety. Capt. E. R. Breslauer, base public information officer at Charleston Air Force Base, South Carolina, stated that the dead pilot, First Lieutenant John William Calvert, 29, of Abbeville, South Carolina, in an F-86D of the 515th Fighter-Interceptor Squadron. The 515th Air Defense Group was active at Duluth Municipal Airport, Minnesota, 16 February 1953 – 18 August 1955, flying D-model Sabres, but it reequipped with F-89 Scorpions before inactivating, and was out of the picture by the time of this event. was practicing a maneuver in which his aircraft was bearing down on a pair of F-86L Sabres of the 444th Fighter-Interceptor Squadron in a collision course with the intent of zeroing in his guns as if to fire, then pulls away. "Capt. Breslauer said the interceptor apparently misjudged the distance or took too long to zero in. He started to pull away at the same time Lt. Bronk did, and the two jets, each doing at least 500 miles an hour, crashed belly to belly." Bronk's wingman, First Lieutenant Delbert T. Grumbach, flew through the scattered debris from the two disintegrating jets, but was able to land safely at Charleston AFB, where he was treated and released from the hospital. "Observers said Grumbach's plane lost its canopy and had 50 or 75 holes in its body resembling flak hits." Lt. Bronk reportedly telephoned his own location near Andrews to authorities, and a helicopter was dispatched to pick him up. He suffered a cut chin. Capt. Breslauer said that the body of the dead pilot was found near the wreckage of his plane, between the towns of Andrews and Lane, South Carolina. Lt. Calvert was the son of Mrs. Harriet Coan Calvert and the late John W. Calvert Sr., of Abbeville. He was a 1953 graduate of West Point. He was a member of the Abbeville Presbyterian Church. He was also survived by one sister, Mrs. Jerry E. Dempsey, of Atlanta, Georgia. Bronk's mother, Mrs. Mary Martha Bronk, lives at Milwaukee, Wisconsin. Grumbach's mother is Mrs. Esther E. Larson, of Mountlake Terrace, Washington.

4 February
Royal Air Force Blackburn Beverly C.1, XH118, c/n 1024, suffers double engine failure, attempts emergency landing at Beihan, Yemen, overturns, killing one of 10 on board.

5 February

A United States Air Force Boeing B-47B-IV-51-BW Stratojet, 51-2349A, c/n 450401, of the 28th Bomb Squadron, 19th Bomb Wing, Ivory 2, second aircraft in two-plane Ivory Cell, out of Homestead AFB, Florida, on unit simulated combat mission (USCM), has c. 00:33 mid-air collision with USAF North American F-86L-50 Sabre, 52-10108, Gold Two, second of three-plane Gold Flight, of the 444th Fighter-Interceptor Squadron, Charleston AFB, South Carolina, near Sylvania, Georgia, jettisons Mark 15, Mod 0 nuclear bomb training weapon casing, No. 47782, from 7,200 feet (2,200 m) over Wassaw Sound off Tybee Beach, Georgia. Stratojet recovers to Hunter AFB, Georgia, bomb is still missing. The Pentagon disputes reports that the plutonium trigger WAS on the weapon. The B-47 was subsequently scrapped. Sabre pilot Lt. Clarence A. Stewart, 23, of Isola, Mississippi, ejects safely, and the B-47 crew are uninjured in emergency landing. Some accounts say pilot Major Howard Richardson made three attempts to land, but the pilot has been quoted as saying he made a straight-in approach, as he wasn't about to risk additional flight time in the damaged bomber.

5 February
A Boeing B-47E-45-LM Stratojet, 52-0388, of the 22d Bombardment Wing, March AFB, California, disappears 50 miles (80 km) WSW of San Miguel Island, California, over the Pacific at night during a Hairclipper mission. It apparently blew up. Three crew lost. No trace found.

5 February
"NEW DELHI, India, Feb. 6 (AP) – Ten Indian air and naval personnel were killed in a military plane crash near Coimbatore in Madras State yesterday, the Defense Ministry said tonight. The plane was engaged in a naval-air exercise over high hill country." Consolidated B-24J Liberator, HE-842, of No. 16 Squadron, came down at Sulur. Pilot was Flight Lieutenant D. Kochar, co-pilot was Flying Officer Jadhav.

6 February
"PALMDALE, Calif. (AP) – A jet fighter plane crashed into the front yard of a home today just after taking off from the airport of this city 35 miles north of Los Angeles. The sheriff's substation said it had no report on casualties. The house itself was not damaged by the diving plane, according to first reports." Lockheed F‑104A-20-LO Starfighter, 56‑0792, c/n 183-1080, suffered engine failure shortly after take-off, coming down one mile west of the airport. Lockheed test pilot Henry C. Bosserman attempts ejection but is killed.

7 February
While on a flight from Fort Gordon, Georgia, to Fort Bragg, North Carolina, a Piasecki H-21C Shawnee of the 8th Transport Helicopter Company, Fort Bragg, crashes in a swampy area 10 miles (16 km) northwest of Hartsville, South Carolina, killing the commander of the 8th, Capt. John H. Asbury, and seriously injuring two others. "The H21 helicopter attached to the outfit commanded by Capt. Asbury was reported missing last night after reporting its position at 18:33 near Columbia. Forty military aircraft searched a 10-mile wide strip between Ft. Bragg and Columbia today before two Negroes came on the wrecked helicopter and notified authorities. The dead man and the two survivors were carried out on litters by members of a rescue party who had to tramp through almost two miles of underbrush and swamp to U.S. Highway 15." The rescue party had to cut the three crewmen out of the wreckage. Capt. Asbury, 35, of Ft. Bragg, and Cape Elizabeth, Maine, C.W.O. Alva William Kepner, 27, of Burbank, California, and Sp.2C. Kenneth R. Struchen, 25, of Garvin, Minnesota, lay trapped in the downed ship "through a night of bitter cold weather. The temperature got down to 32 degrees (0°C) this morning at Columbia, 50 miles (80 km) from the crash scene." Kepner was treated at Byerly Hospital at Hartsville for a broken leg, shock, and exposure. Struchen, also hospitalized at Hartsville, was treated for a broken shoulder, shock, and exposure. "Officials said the cause of the crash was not determined, and a board would investigate."

8 February
A nuclear weapon was inadvertently dropped from a Boeing B-52D Stratofortress bomber parked at a pad and ready to be unloaded at Ellsworth AFB, South Dakota. Preliminary reports indicated that an airman erred and pulled the manual release handle which released the weapon from the bomb bay and through the unopened bomb bay doors. Damage to the weapon included a dented afterbody, two smashed fins, and a displaced secondary. There was no capsule aboard the aircraft. The bomb was loaded aboard a trailer and removed to the Q Area weapons maintenance depot (Site F) at Rushmore Air Force Station, South Dakota, adjacent to Ellsworth AFB. The damaged weapon was later exchanged for an operational weapon from stockpile.

8 February
"THOMASTON, Ga., Feb. 8 AP – One Army officer was injured fatally and another hurt seriously tonight in a crash of their plane near this west central Georgia town. One was pronounced dead upon arrival at a Thomaston hospital. The hospital declined to give the names of either of the officers. It was reported that their plane crashed en route from Ft. Bragg, N.C. to Ft. Benning, Ga." On 9 February, the public information office at Ft. Benning released the identities of the officers involved. Killed was 1st Lt. Marshall E. Stephenson, 23, whose parents live in Macon. He was a 1955 graduate of Mercer University, and was en route from his unit at Ft. Bragg to Ft. Benning, when the small plane suffered a power failure. "A companion on the flight, Capt. Bernard Towsed II, 29, (hometown unavailable) was injured in the crackup. He was brought to Upson County Hospital here (Thomaston) with a broken leg and facial cuts."

11 February
A USAF Boeing B-52D Stratofortress, 56‑0610, of the 28th Bomb Wing, on a training mission that had originated at Larson AFB near Moses Lake, Washington, crashes at Ellsworth AFB, South Dakota, during a landing attempt in a snowstorm, killing five aircrewmen and injuring six other persons. This was the first crash of a B-52 at Ellsworth.
12 February
In the third accident for the unit in nine days, pilot Lt. Joseph O. Sweeney, 24, of Orleans Road, St. Andrews Parish, Charleston, South Carolina, is killed in the 14:04 takeoff crash of a North American F-86L Sabre of the 444th Fighter-Interceptor Squadron c. two miles off the end of the main instrument runway at Charleston Air Force Base, South Carolina, the plane coming down in a wooded area in the vicinity of Midland Park Road and exploding on impact. He had taken off on a practice intercept mission. Base spokesmen on 13 February said that Lt. Sweeney's fighter was fully loaded with rockets but that none exploded and all were accounted for by that morning. "Squadron spokesmen today (13 February) said the cause of the plane's trouble was materiel failure due to fire. The plane's engine was reported to have sputtered and caught fire immediately after lifting from the end of the runway. The crash occurred on civilian-owned property near the Midland Park Road."

15 February
A Douglas VC-47A Skytrain, 42-93817, c/n 13771, built as a C-47A-25-DK and upgraded, en route from its home base, Ramstein-Landstuhl Air Base, Germany, to Istanbul, departs Capodichino Airport, Naples, for a flight to Athens, with 16 servicemen aboard. Following a radio call 30 minutes after departure when the crew reported en route at 6500 feet and switching to the Rome ATC, nothing further is heard from the flight, which never contacts Rome, nor arrives in Greece. Dense fog over the Ionian Sea and mountainous southern Italy on 17 February greatly impeded search efforts for the missing aircraft. "U.S. authorities did not exclude the possibility the plane might have been forced down in Communist Albania." The burned and scattered wreckage is found 19 February high on the rugged slope of Mount Vesuvius at the 3,800 foot level, about 200 feet below the top of the cone of the volcano which overlooks Naples Bay. A search plane first spotted the wreckage following "four days of fruitless ground, sea and air search impeded by fog, rain and snow." Patrols of U.S. servicemen, Italian soldiers and carabinieri reached the crash site four hours after it was found, battling though heavy snow, but reported no survivors amongst the 16 on board. They stated that all had been identified. "A surgeon said death apparently was instantaneous." There were 15 Air Force officers and men from Ramstein-Landstuhl Air Base, and one seaman of the USS Tripoli on board. "Officials declined to venture a theory on the cause of the crash except that the weather was bad and the pilot, Capt. Martin S. Schwartz of Ashland, Kentucky, had not previously flown from Capodichino field." The bodies of the victims were brought to Capodichino Airport and on Friday 21 February, they were flown to Germany.

17 February
A Republic F-84F Thunderstreak from Dobbins Air Force Base, Georgia, crashed in flames c. 5 miles south of Barnwell, South Carolina, "narrowly missing a church and striking a power line in its plunge to the ground." The pilot, identified only as having the last name of Morrell, rank and first name not included in the initial press account, safely ejected from the jet and parachuted to safety. "He was taken to the Barnwell airport where an Air Force plane returned him to Dobbins. Police listed his last name as Morrell and said he was not injured. His first name and rank were not immediately available here. Officers said no single piece of the airplane more than four feet long could be found at the crash site." Additional Associated Press accounts identified the pilot as Lt. Billy Morrell, 24, of the 128th Fighter-Interceptor Squadron, Georgia Air National Guard. Morrell, of Marrietta, Georgia, and a native of Greer, South Carolina, was on a "normal scramble" flight, according to a Dobbins spokesman, when his jet flamed out at 10,000 feet.

18 February
"OCEANA, Va., Feb. 18 – A Navy jet pilot, making practice carrier landings at the Fentress Auxiliary Air Station near here, was killed early today when his plane apparently lost power and he rode it down through a crash landing. The pilot was identified as Lt.(j.g.) Ralph Walker Anderson, 24, of Orlando, Florida."

20 February
The launch of Convair XSM-65 Atlas 11A, 56-6748, from LC-12, Cape Canaveral Air Force Station, Florida, at 17:46 GMT (14:48 EST), ends in failure about two minutes into the flight at an apogee of 90 km (56 mi) when the flight controls fail and stage 1 explodes.

20 February
"SAN DIEGO, Calif. AP – The deaths of three Navy men and injury to two others in a plane crash and explosion on the aircraft carrier Shangri-la off the California coast was disclosed by the Navy last night. One of those killed was the pilot of an F11-F Grumman Tiger Jet coming in for a landing on the carrier. The other victims were working on the flight deck when the accident occurred Thursday afternoon, the Navy reported. The dead were: Lt. David Oscar Gudal, the pilot, whose wife, Maureen, lives at Sunnyvale, Calif.; Ronald G. Payne, Airman 3.c., whose wife, Myrle, lives at San Jose, Calif., and Clandell N. Hardeman, airman, of Smithville, Tex. The injured were identified only as: Richard Leon Davis, airman, and S. N. Brown, an airman. The Navy said the accident occurred when the plane attempted a landing and failed to engage the arresting gear on the flight deck." F11F-1, BuNo 141734, was assigned to VA-156, coded 'NH-xxx', the first Tiger squadron to complete carrier qualifications.

25 February
During joint exercises with the U.S. Navy at Naval Station Mayport, Duval County, Florida, a flight of four Royal Canadian Navy McDonnell F2H-3 Banshee fighters performs a formation takeoff but immediately flies into a dense fog bank; the rearmost aircraft, BuNo 126428 of VF-871, drops out of formation and vanishes. The airplane's nosewheel and pilot Lt. Barry Troy's helmet are later found floating in the ocean nearby, but no other signs of the missing aircraft or pilot are ever found.

25 February
North American XSM-64 Navaho (G-26), 54–3097, comprising missile 8 and booster 12, the final launch from LC-9, Cape Canaveral Air Force Station, Florida, of this early attempt at a supersonic cruise missile design, under Project RISE (Research In the Supersonic Environment) to gather data for the X-15 and XB-70 programs for NASA, ends abruptly when the booster cuts off at T+20s. The vehicle "arched over and plunged toward the Atlantic Ocean. Just above the water it burst into orange flame and black smoke." Of 12 vehicles built, eleven were launched but no flight reached a successful conclusion. The whole project had been cancelled in July 1957 as ICBM developments had overtaken this piggy-back design. The many failed launch attempts earned the project the uncomplimentary appellation, "Never go, Navaho." At the time of cancellation, $700 million had been expended on the program with less than 90 minutes flight time accrued.

26 February
A Boeing RB-47E-25-BW Stratojet, 52-0720, c/n 450941, of the 26th Strategic Reconnaissance Wing, Lockbourne AFB, Ohio, crashes on approach at Sugar Grove, Ohio, six miles south of Lancaster. The aircraft hit the ground at an angle of 50 degrees, narrowly missing an Ohio Fuel natural gas pumping facility by a few hundred feet. It was determined that the aircraft was allowed to get into an unusual attitude and/or high speed, through disorientation, from which there was no recovery. In actuality a wheel door had broken away and prevented the control surfaces to be fully active. KWF were 1st Lt. Theodore L. Jenner, 26, of Evanston, Illinois, aircraft commander; 1st Lt. George M. Reiley, 25, Hyattsville, Maryland, pilot; 1st Lt. Earl N. Fogle, 27, Pittsburgh, Pennsylvania, navigator; and 1st Lt. Alvin B. Storey, 25, of Charlotte, North Carolina, an additional pilot aboard for training.

27 February
A Douglas-Tulsa B-47E-30-DT Stratojet, 52-0181, c/n 44035, of the 40th Bombardment Wing (Medium), based at Schilling Air Force Base, Kansas, crashes short of the runway due to fuel exhaustion during a landing at Biggs Air Force Base, Texas, killing one member of the four crew on board. Navigator Lt. Samuel G. Hardin, of Salina, Kansas, died as the bomber came down on short final, scattering wreckage over a half-mile area. Three other crew members walked away from the wrecked airframe, with minor injuries. They were Lt. Col. Hilding L. Jacobson Jr., instructor pilot; Capt. Gerald Weimar, plane commander; and Lt. Donald Maisel, copilot; all of Salina, Kansas. Lt. Hardin is survived by his wife, Lucia Hardin, of Salina.

4 March
Royal Navy de Havilland Sea Venom FAW.22, XG732, 'B 440', of 891 Squadron, piloted by a pair of exchange pilots from the United States Marine Corps, lands on HMS Bulwark without nose gear which refuses to extend. Airframe is repaired, but is lost in a ditching off of the same carrier on 9 May 1958.

4 March
A Royal Canadian Navy McDonnell F2H-3 Banshee, BuNo 126333, Sqn. No. 142 of VF-871, suffers an apparent brake failure while taxiing aboard HMCS Bonaventure (CVL 22) and rolls off the carrier's deck. Pilot LCDR Brian Bell-Irving ejects as airplane falls, but partially opened canopy does not jettison, and Bell-Irving is knocked unconscious and severely injured as ejection seat smashes through canopy and slams into ocean surface. The damaged fighter jet catches fire and sinks; Bell-Irving is subsequently hauled aboard escort destroyer HMCS Haida (DDE 215) but dies from his injuries. This is the only operational ejection from a RCN Banshee.

7 March
A USMC Fairchild R4Q-1 Packet transport, BuNo 128741, c/n 10570, crashes in the Pacific Ocean off Naha, Okinawa while returning from Naval Air Station Cubi Point to Atsugi, Japan. The R4Q was being accompanied by a Douglas AD-6 Skyraider, BuNo 135350, both aircraft an instrument approach into Naha AFB. Apparently the AD-6 had communication or navigation problems and elected to fly wing on the R4Q during the approach. Both planes collided and crashed in the Pacific Ocean, 5 km. from the base. Seven crew and 19 passengers on the transport were KWF, as was the Skyraider pilot. Nine of the victims were members of VMA-323.

11 March

A United States Air Force Boeing B-47E-60-LM Stratojet, 53-1876, c/n 290, from Hunter AFB, Georgia, jettisons nuclear weapons casing from 15,000 feet (4,600 m) over rural section of Florence, South Carolina, high-explosives detonate on impact causing property damage, several civilian injuries. No fuel capsule installed on bomb.

13 March
A Boeing B-47B-30-BW Stratojet, 51-2104, of the 379th Bombardment Wing, from Homestead AFB, Florida, crashes shortly after take-off, breaking into four parts while making a shallow turn at 1,500 feet (460 m), coming down 10 nm southwest of Homestead. Four crew killed: Maj. Leon F. Hatcher Jr., aircraft commander; Maj. Frank H. Whyte Jr., instructor pilot; 1st Lt. Paul J. Pennington, Co-Pilot; Capt. George Reid, Navigator. On the same date, a TB-47B-10-BW Stratojet, 50‑0013, c/n 450028, of the 3520th Combat Crew Training Wing, out of McConnell AFB breaks up in flight over Tulsa, Oklahoma. Student pilot, instructor eject, parachute to safety, but crewman occupying the navigator's position does not eject and is killed. Both accidents are due to unexpected fatigue issues in the B-47 fleet.

18 March
Test pilot Leo J. "Pete" Colapietro bails out of Douglas F4D Skyray during routine test flight over the Pacific Ocean which goes out of control, ejects at c. 650 mph (1,050 km/h), suffers right arm broken in two places, fractured pelvis, two cracked vertebrae, and a dislocated shoulder. Parachute deploys automatically, however, and pilot is rescued from the water after 45 minutes by a helicopter and a rescue launch. He remains in hospital for over six weeks.

21 March
A Boeing B-47E-25-LM Stratojet, 52–244, c/n 52, of the 306th Bombardment Wing, MacDill AFB, Florida, breaks up over the Avon Park, Florida bombing range.

27 March
A United States Air Force Douglas C-124C Globemaster II, 52-0981, collides in midair with a USAF Fairchild C-119C Flying Boxcar, 49-0195, over farmland near Bridgeport, Texas, United States, killing all 15 on the Globemaster and all 3 on the Flying Boxcar. The two transports crossed paths over a VHF omnidirectional range (VOR) navigational radio beacon during cruise flight under instrument flight rules; conditions were overcast with zero visibility within the clouds, and haze and fog were observed in the area. The C-124 was on a north-northeasterly heading flying at its properly assigned altitude of 7,000 ft (2,100 m); the C-119 was on a southeasterly heading, and the crew had been instructed to fly at 6,000 ft (1,800 m), but their aircraft was not flying at this altitude when the collision occurred.

10 April
A Convair F-102 Delta Dagger crashes between two houses in Rio Linda, California. A witness said he thought the pilot dove the plane to miss houses in the area. Pilot was the only casualty.

10 April
A USAF Boeing B-47E-90-BW Stratojet, 52-0470, c/n 450755, the first Block E-90-BW, of the 376th Bombardment Wing (Medium) out of Lockbourne AFB, Ohio, crashes near North Collins, New York, after disintegrating in flight at c. 20,000 feet (6,100 m) altitude. It had been scheduled to rendezvous with a KC-97 Stratofreighter of the 341st Air Refueling Squadron, out of Dow AFB, Maine, when it exploded. The tanker was about one mile ahead of the bomber when it went down. All four crew KWF. Dead are Maj. Harold L. Kelly, aircraft commander, 34, Eugene, Oregon; Lt. Col. John R. Glyer, pilot, 38, Wilmington, Delaware; 1st Lt. Richard Tellier, co-pilot, Pompano Beach, Florida; and 1st Lt. Albert Gene Moncla, navigator, 24, Shreveport, Louisiana.

13 April
A USAF Douglas C-133A-10-DL Cargomaster, 54-0146, c/n 44716 of the 1607 ATW crashed inverted during a local flight test out of Dover AFB, DE 17 minutes after takeoff near Georgetown. 4 Fatalities.

14 April
A USAF Douglas RB-66B-DL Destroyer, 54–422, c/n 44722, of the 10th Tactical Reconnaissance Wing, crashes in an open field four miles (6 km) from RAF Sculthorpe, UK, while making a blind landing as part of a routine training flight. All three crew KWF. The aircraft was receiving flight instructions from the radar control tower at Sculthorpe. Although the weather was good, the jet was operating under simulated blackout conditions.

15 April
Two more Boeing B-47 Stratojet bombers of Strategic Air Command suffer crashes this date. One was B-47E-20-LM, 52–235, c/n 43, of the 306th Bomb Wing, which crashed after take-off from MacDill AFB, Florida, with 4 crew KWF. The bomber was destroyed when it encountered the parent thunderstorm of one of five tornados that touched down in Florida and Georgia that day. The plane unsuccessfully attempted to fly at lower altitudes and avoid the system. The other was B-47E-100-BW, 52-0562, c/n 450847, of the 509th Bomb Wing, which crashed after take-off from Pease AFB, New Hampshire. 4 crew KWF.

16 April
U.S. Air Force pilot 1st Lt. Robert Yoshizumi, 26, of Honolulu, survives ejection from his disabled North American F-100C-25-NA Super Sabre, 54-1982, at 300 feet (91 m) altitude. Fighter, of 36th Fighter-Day Wing, 22nd Fighter-Day Squadron, Bitburg Air Base, crashes in eastern suburb of Matzen, West Germany after entering spin. He suffers only minor injuries as his parachute swings one time before landing.

21 April

A United States Air Force North American F-100F-5-NA Super Sabre, 56-3755, collides in mid-air with United Airlines Flight 736, a Douglas DC-7 registered N6328C, at 21,000 feet (6,400 m) about 9 miles (14 km) southwest of Las Vegas, Nevada – the two F-100 crewmen and all 47 on board the DC-7 are killed.

Circa early May
A Tupolev Tu-16 is forced down on an ice runway at Soviet North Pole drift station Severnyy Polyus-6, (North Pole) NP-6, where it is discovered and photographed by a RCAF Avro Lancaster of No. 408 Squadron on an Apex Rocket reconnaissance sortie, the first detailed images of the design to be made by the West. Additional photo missions find the Soviets dismantling the bomber, that its starboard main gear was missing, and that an engine had visible damage.

5 May
Lt. Gerald Stull steers his failing Convair F-102A-75-CO Delta Dagger, 56-1348, of the 327th Fighter-Interceptor Squadron, away from residential homes while attempting a landing at Truax Field, Madison, Wisconsin, at 13:30, and aims it for Lake Monona, ejecting at the last moment, too late to save himself. Posthumously awarded the Distinguished Flying Cross at Tyndall AFB, Florida, on 5 August, a trust fund was established to provide an education for the pilot's infant son. A memorial to Stull's heroism is installed at Hudson Park near the lake 51 years later.

8 May
An Indian Air Force de Havilland Vampire crashed into the Delhi Flying Club hangar at Safdar Jung Airport, Delhi while attempting an emergency landing following an in-flight fire. Both Vampire crew died and four engineers working in the hangar were killed and 11 aircraft were destroyed.

9 May
A USAF North American F-100F-10-NA Super Sabre, serial number 56-3810, crashed 8 miles (13 km) NNE of Kadena Air Base, Japan. Instructor/test pilot Capt. Theodore Christos and rear seat pilot Capt. James Looney ejected but were killed. Crash Investigation Board report indicated cause of crash was undetermined.

20 May
A United States Air Force Lockheed T-33A-5-LO Shooting Star, 53-5966, operated by the Maryland Air National Guard collided in mid-air with a Capital Airlines Vickers Viscount, registered N7410 operating flight Capital 300 at 8,000 ft (2,400 m) four miles (6 km) east of Brunswick, Maryland. All 11 on board the Viscount were killed and the T-33 co-pilot, the T-33 pilot ejected and survived.

23 May
A Nike Ajax missile of Battery B, 526th AAA Missile Battalion, exploded accidentally at a battery at Site NY-53 near Leonardo, New Jersey, at 13:15 on this date, setting off six other missiles of A Section, killing 6 soldiers and 4 civilians. The nearest missile in B Section had its booster ignited by flying shrapnel and it flew into a nearby hill, but the warhead fortunately failed to explode. This was the first fatal Nike Ajax accident. A memorial can be found at Fort Hancock in the Sandy Hook Unit of Gateway National Recreation Area.

25 May
USAF Lockheed RC-121D-LO Warning Star, 55–123, of the 551st AEWCW, burns out on the ramp at Otis AFB, Massachusetts, 0 dead.

5 June
Second prototype Saunders-Roe SR.53, XD151, crashed during an abandoned take-off whilst testing at RAE Boscombe Down, killing its pilot, Squadron Leader John S. Booth, DFC. Project cancelled.

13 June
A USAF Lockheed T-33A-1-LO Shooting Star, 56-1604, from RAF Alconbury and an RAF English Electric Canberra T.4, WT477, letting down into RAF Wyton, Huntingdonshire, collide in mid-air and come down c. 5 miles from Alconbury, killing all crew of both aircraft. The T-33 had just overshot at Alconbury when the collision occurred at c. 1,400 feet. The Canberra impacted in a cornfield near the village of Bishop Norton, near Brigg, Lincolnshire. In a separate accident c. 10 minutes later, an airmen 2nd class mechanic, Vernon L. Morgan, with no flight training, makes an unauthorized take-off from RAF Alconbury in a B-45A-5-NA Tornado bomber, 47-046, of the 86th Bomb Squadron, 47th Bomb Wing, crashes three minutes later, the wreckage blocking the British Railways Eastern Division Edinburgh – King's Cross mainline at Abbots Ripton.

27 June

A USAF Boeing KC-135A-BN Stratotanker, 56-3599, c/n 17348, call sign Cocoa, of the 4050th Air Refueling Wing, Strategic Air Command, crashes on takeoff from Westover AFB, Chicopee, Massachusetts, attempting to set a world speed record from New York-London. 7 crew and 8 passenger fatalities. Departing Westover's Runway 23 just after midnight, with a takeoff weight of over 289,000 pounds, the aircraft failed to climb, and after 45 seconds of flight, dragged the port wingtip, the right wing struck powerlines, and the plane came down across the Massachusetts Turnpike, exploding in the backyard of a family farm adjacent to the highway. Amongst those killed were aircraft commander Lt. Col. George Broutsas, commanding officer of the 99th Air Refueling Squadron, 39, of Brattleboro, Vermont; 1st Lt. Joe C. Sweet, 26, of Chandler, Arizona, co-pilot; Capt, James E. Shipman, 35, of Kansas City, navigator; M/Sgt. Donald H. Gabbord, 38, of Los Gatos, California, boom operator; Capt. John B. Gordon, third pilot and aide to 8th Air Force commander Maj. Gen. Walter C. Sweeny Jr.; and T/Sgt. Joseph G. Hutter, crew chief. Also aboard was Brig. Gen. Donald W. Saunders, 45, commander of the 57th Air Division at Westover, and commander of the four plane record attempt, of which Cocoa was the third to depart. Eight civilians also died: William J. Cochran, 36, and William R. Enyart, 57, representatives of the National Aeronautic Association as official observers; and six journalists covering the flight, retired Brig. Gen. A. Robert Ginsburgh, 63, and Glen A. Williams, 41, of U.S. News & World Report; Time-Life's Washington bureau chief James L. McConaughy Jr., 42; the Boston Herald Traveler's veteran aviation writer, Robert B. Sibley, 57; United Press International's foreign affairs writer Norman J. Montellier, 37; and Daniel J. Coughlin Jr., 31, of the Associated Press. The first two tankers to depart, call signs Alpha and Bravo, completed the speed run over 3,442 miles in 5 hours, 27 minutes, 42.8 seconds, and 5 hours, 29 minutes, 37.4 seconds, respectively. The fourth KC-135 did not depart. This was the first loss of the type since in entered service nearly two years before. Maj. Gen. Walter Sweeney, after a lengthy and exhaustive investigation, explained the possibility of a peculiar combination of circumstances. As the ground dropped away at the edge of the runway, a wind-shear may have occurred at a crucial moment, interfering with the lift of the plane. In 1960, the USAF established the “Saunders Trophy,” to be awarded to the Air Refueling Squadron compiling the highest score in combined refueling and navigation. The inscription reads, "Saunders Perpetual Trophy, SAC Combat Competition."

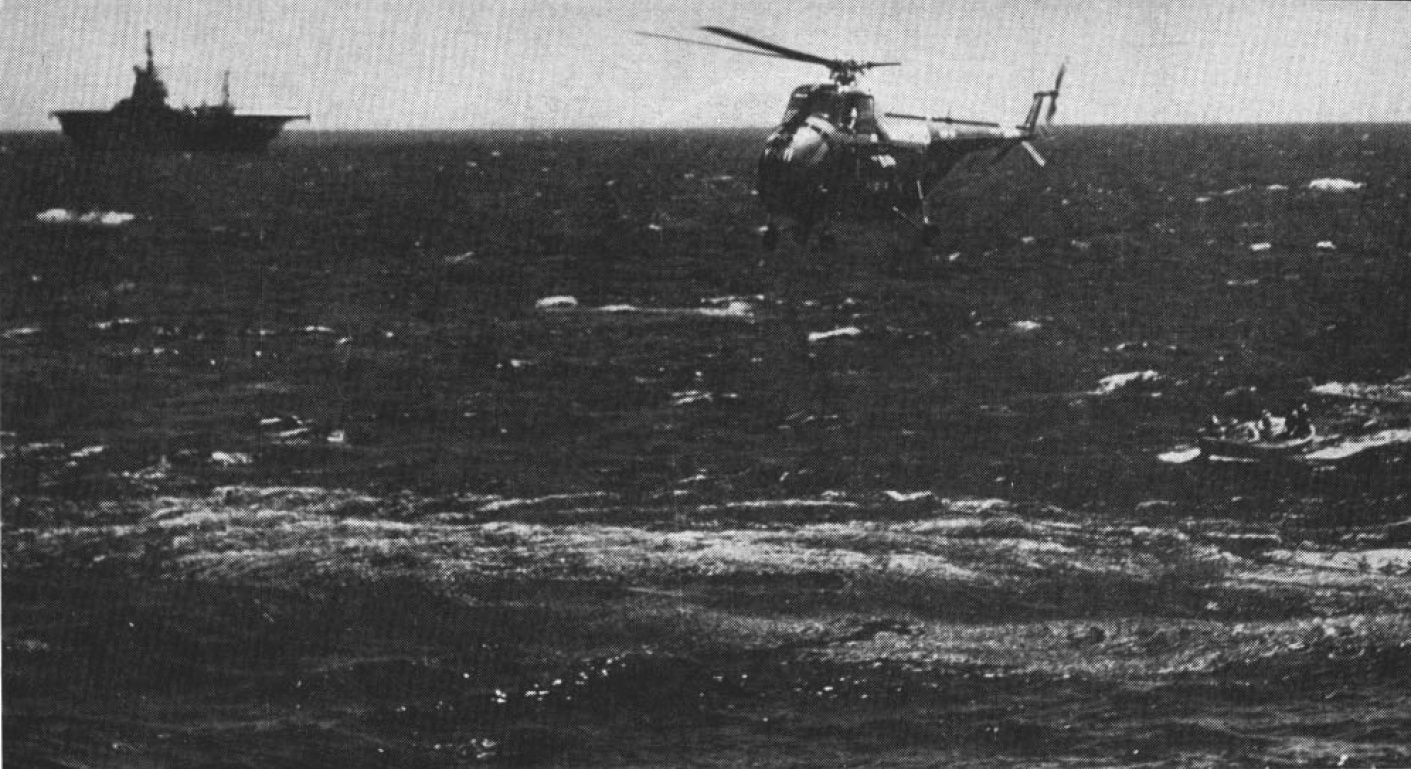
A HO4S from Boxer during rescue operations for the crew of a crashed USAF C-124, 4 July 1958.

4 July
A USAF Douglas C-124C Globemaster II, 50–107, c/n 43245, on a flight from Hickam Air Force Base, Hawaii to Wake Island crashed 320 km northwest of Johnston Island due to an engine failure. A propeller blade of the No. 3 engine broke away and struck the aileron, causing severe control problems. The plane crashed at about 01:33 Hawaii time. 3 of the crew 7 on board were rescued twelve hours later by a HO4S helicopter from USS Boxer (CVS-21).

8 July
A Lockheed U-2A, 56-6713, Article 380, of the SAC's 4028th Strategic Reconnaissance Squadron (SRS), based at Laughlin Air Force Base, Del Rio, Texas, is lost near Wayside, Texas, when it goes out of control at high altitude, killing RAF pilot, Sqn. Ldr. Christopher Walker, one of four RAF officers in U-2 training. This aircraft, the 40th U-2 built, was delivered to the USAF in July 1957, and assigned to the 4080th Strategic Reconnaissance Wing, Laughlin AFB, Texas, where it was configured as a "ferret" aircraft.

9 July
A second Lockheed U-2A, 56-6698, Article 365, of the SAC's 4028th Strategic Reconnaissance Squadron (SRS) based at Laughlin Air Force Base, Del Rio, Texas, crashes southwest of Tucumcari, New Mexico, killing its pilot, Capt. Al Chapin Jr., the second in two days. It went out of control at high altitude. This aircraft, the 25th U-2, and fifth of the first USAF production batch, was delivered to the Air Force at Groom Lake in January 1957, moving to the 4080th SRW at Laughlin AFB in June 1957.

21 July
1st Lt. Charles "Bud" Rogers has to eject from his North American F-86L Sabre, 52-10134, after it catches on fire during an engineering test flight near Walsh, Illinois. He is uninjured.
26 July
United States Air Force test-pilot Iven Carl Kincheloe Jr. is killed in unsuccessful ejection attempt after the engine of his Lockheed F-104A-15-LO Starfighter, 56-0772, fails during takeoff at Edwards Air Force Base, California, United States. While flying a Bell X-2, Kincheloe became the first man to exceed 100,000 ft (30,500 m) of altitude, and he is often credited as the first man to enter outer space. Kinross Air Force Base, Michigan renamed Kincheloe Air Force Base in September 1959.

End of July
Two Armee de l'Air Sud Aviation Vautour IIBs, 617 and 618, are lost in crash landings, on one day, due to a failure in the hydraulic system of the "Monoblock" tail.

6 August
A Lockheed U-2A, 56-6697, Article 364, the fourth airframe of the initial USAF order, delivered January 1957 to USAF at Groom Lake, then to 4080th SRW, Laughlin AFB, Texas, in June: 1957, crashes this date killing trainee Lt. Paul Haughland. Despite Cessna L-27 chase plane to radio instructions, Haughland's U-2 rolled rapidly to starboard at 200 feet during landing approach and struck ground in a near-vertical attitude. Accident report notes that the flight manual did not sufficiently highlight the unusual stall characteristics.

8 September
Two Boeing B-52 Stratofortress bombers collide over the town of Airway Heights near Fairchild AFB, Washington. B-52D, 56–661 and 56–681, both crash. Thirteen crew members are killed, while three survive. There were no casualties on the ground.

8 September
Third of three flying prototypes of the ultra long-range, high-altitude single-seat super interceptor Lavochkin La-250, is written off in landing crash, despite having its nose dropped by six degrees to improve visibility. This final design from the Lavochkin bureau will be cancelled without entering service and before all testing is completed. Radar and missile armament never fitted to airframe.

16 September
A Boeing B-52D Stratofortress, 55-065, crashes in the August Kahl farmyard at Inver Grove Heights, Minnesota, near St. Paul, after losing its tail section in flight. Only the co-pilot, Capt. Jack D. Craft, 29, of Sturgis, Massachusetts, survived of the eight crew. Air Force officials said that he was in shock and unable to answer questions. The jet tore a hole 300 feet long by 15 feet deep in the farmyard. The plane exploded as it hit, setting fire to the farm buildings. Eight members of the Kahl family were injured, and three remain hospitalized. They lost all their possessions in the explosion and fire.

19 September
Lockheed C-130A Hercules 56-0526, of the 314th Troop Carrier Wing, has a mid-air collision with a French Armée de l'Air Dassault Super Mystère over France.

20 September
Prototype Avro Vulcan VX770 in an airshow at RAF Syerston suffers total collapse of the plane's right wing. The craft spirals out of control and crashes, killing the entire aircrew and 3 people on the ground. VX770 was known to have had a weaker wing structure then production aircraft. The aircraft had been testing the Rolls-Royce Conway installation and was returning from a test flight via Syerston. See here for more details.

24 September
Twelfth of 13 North American X-10s, GM-52-5, c/n 12, on X-10 Drone BOMARC target mission 1, out of Cape Canaveral, Florida. The remaining X-10s are expended as targets for Bomarc and Nike antiaircraft missiles. The X-10 flies out over the ocean, then accelerates toward the Cape at supersonic speed. A Bomarc A missile comes within lethal miss distance. The X-10 then autolands on the Skid Strip, but both the drag chute and landing barrier fail. The vehicle runs off the runway and explodes.

25 September
Supermarine Scimitar F.1, XD240, 'V-145', of 803 Naval Air Squadron, arriving aboard from RNAS Lossiemouth via RNAS Yeovilton, falls off the side of HMS Victorious at low speed into the English Channel off Portsmouth after failure of the No.1 arrestor wire upon landing. The pilot, Cdr. John Desmond Russell, the Squadron CO, is unable to open the canopy, and trapped in the cockpit, he drowns when the airframe sinks to the seabed, despite efforts of plane guard crewman Lt. R. A. Duxbury from the rescue Westland Whirlwind. Members of the press had been invited along to watch 803 Squadron embark. Nose of aircraft and pilot's body recovered four weeks later.

25 September
Boeing RB-47E Stratojet, 52–276, is written off when it veers off runway, landing gear collapses, port inner engine nacelle torn from mount, suffers fire. Post crash footage: http://www.criticalpast.com/video/65675022547_Boeing-B-47-Stratojet-bomber_crash-during-take-off_officers-examining_runway

10 October
Thunderbirds support aircraft, Fairchild C-123B Provider, 55-4521, en route from Hill AFB, Utah to McChord AFB, Washington, with five flight crew and 14 maintenance personnel, flies through a flock of birds, crashes into a hillside six miles (10 km) east of Payette, Idaho, just before 18:30, killing all on board. This remains the worst accident in Thunderbirds team history.

15 October
A USAF Fairchild C-123B-6-FA Provider, 54-0614, c/n 20063, en route from Dobbins AFB, Georgia, to Mitchel Field, Long Island, New York, runs out of fuel, comes down on the Southern State Parkway on Long Island while attempting emergency landing at Zahn's Airport at North Amityville, one-half mile short, injuring five, and killing one motorist. The transport skids several hundred feet, passes through an underpass, and strikes three cars. Harold J. Schneider, West Islip, New York, dies of head injuries shortly after the accident. Three Air Force men and two women motorists suffer minor injuries. They are identified as Mrs. Mary Rehm, Islip Terrace, and Mrs. Frank Calabrese, West Islip. The injured Air Force men are identified as Capt. John Florio, Sgt. Wallett A. Carman and Sgt. Edgar H. Williamson. The pilot was Lt. Gary L. Moolson. The aircraft, with a 119 foot wingspan, passed through a 50-foot wide underpass, shearing both outer wings, the port engine, and the vertical fin, before coming to a stop on fire.

18 October
NAVY SQUADRON AEWRON FIFTEEN (VW-15) AIRCRAFT: Lockheed WV-2 Warning Star, BuNo 141294, LOCATION: NAS Argentia, Newfoundland. EVENT: Crashed into Placentia Bay 1000 feet short of runway during CGA landing trying to get under weather; flight from Pax to Arg. U.S. Naval Aviation Safety Center, Accident Brief No. 10, May 1960: "The ceiling was reported indefinite 200 feet, visibility 2 miles in drizzle and fog. A precision approach was commenced to the duty runway. The approach was within tolerances and normal until after passing through GCA minimums, at which time the aircraft went below glide path and the pilot was instructed to take a waveoff. The waveoff was not executed until after the aircraft had actually made contact with the runway. After climbout, GCA was contacted and a second approach was requested to commence with no delay. The pilot advised GCA that the runway was in sight just before GCA gave him a waveoff on the first approach. The second approach was again normal until the final controller gave the instructions, "Approaching GCA minimums." The aircraft immediately commenced dropping below glide path. An emergency pullup was given, but the aircraft collided with the water [Placentia Bay] and came to rest 2050 feet east of the approach end of the runway. It sank in 26 feet of water and 11 persons lost their lives." LOSS: 11 of 29-man crew & passengers killed: CREW: LT Donald A. Becker, PPC, CDR Raymond L. Klassy, VW-13, ENS Donald E. Mulligan, Lyle W. Foster, American Red Cross, A. S. Corrado, Robert N. Elliot, AN, R. J. Emerson, Clarence J. Shea, J. E. Strange, William Jerome Taylor, AD3 (body never recovered), and D. D. Wilson.

22 October
British European Airlines Flight 142, a Vickers Viscount 701, G-ANHC, callsign Beeline 142, on scheduled service en route from London Heathrow Airport to Naples Airport, collided with an Aeronautica Militare North American F-86E Sabre at 23,500 feet over Nettuno, near Anzio, Italy. All 26 passengers and 5 crew on board are killed. The Sabre was the lead aircraft of four on a tactical training exercise when it hit the Viscount. Captain Giovanni Svorelli ejected and survived. While no blame was attributed for the accident it was noted that the Viscount had strayed out of the airway and into the military prohibited area.

24 October
RAF Avro Vulcan B.1 XA908 of 83 Squadron crashed into the residential neighbourhood of Grosse Pointe Park on the East side of Detroit, Michigan, USA after a complete electrical systems failure. The failure occurred at around 30,000 ft (9,100 m) and the backup system should have provided 20 minutes of emergency power to allow the aircraft to divert to Kellogg Airfield, Battle Creek, MI. Due to a short circuit in the service busbar, backup power only lasted three minutes before expiring and locking the aircraft controls. XA908 then went into a dive of between 60–70° before it crashed, leaving a 40 foot (13 m) crater in the ground, which was later excavated to 70 ft (21 m) deep in an unsuccessful attempt to find the cockpit of the aircraft. All six crew members were killed, including the co-pilot, who had ejected. The co-pilot’s ejector seat was found in Lake St Clair but his body was never found. Conflicting sources claim his body was found the following spring in the lake without a life vest. There were no reports of casualties on the ground.

26 October
North American F-86L Sabre, 53-0569, of the 330th Fighter-Interceptor Squadron, Stewart AFB, New York, crashes west of that base while on approach in a snow storm, killing pilot Lt. Gary W. Crane.

4 November
A United States Air Force Boeing B-47E-56-BW Stratojet, 51-2391, of the 12th Bomb Squadron, 341st Bomb Wing (M), catches fire during take-off from Dyess AFB, Texas, crashes from 1,500 feet (460 m) altitude. Three crew eject, okay: Capt. Don E. Youngmark, 37, aircraft commander; Capt. John M. Gerding, 27, pilot; and Capt. John M. Dowling, 30, observer and navigator. The crew chief was killed – no bail out attempted. Fire sets off single bomb casing on board, creating crater 35×6 feet. Some tritium contamination at crash site.

13 November
Seventh of 13 North American X-10s, GM-19313, c/n 7, on X-10 Drone BOMARC target mission 2, out of Cape Canaveral, Florida. The X-10 flies out over the ocean, then accelerates toward the Cape. However the Bomarc A fails to launch. Autoland is successful, but again the drag chute and landing barrier both fail, and the vehicle burns after overrunning the runway.

21 November
Fairey Gannet AS.1, WN345, fitted with Armstrong Siddeley ASMD.8 Double Mamba 112 coupled turboprop powerplant, suffers belly landing this date during test programme, caused by a partially retracted nosewheel. The pilot tries unsuccessfully to get the gear to deploy. Lands gear-up on foam-covered runway 22 at Bitteswell, suffering minimal damage. Repaired, it is back in the air within weeks.

26 November
A United States Air Force Boeing B-47 Stratojet on Alert Status at Chennault AFB, Louisiana, accidentally ignites RATO assisted take-off bottles, is pushed off runway into tow vehicle, catches fire, completely destroying single nuclear weapon on board. Contamination limited to area within aircraft wreckage.

30 November
Royal Canadian Air Force Sikorsky H-34A Choctaw, 9634, c/n 58–224, one of six on strength, of 111 Communications Unit, crashes this date, stricken 1 December.

9 December
U.S. Army Major General Bogardus Snowden "Bugs" Cairns, a key proponent of the concept of armed helicopters, was killed instantly when his Bell H-13 Sioux helicopter crashed minutes after take off in dense woods northwest of Fort Rucker, Alabama headquarters. He was en route to Matteson Range to observe a firepower rehearsal in preparation for a full-scale armed helicopter display. He was commander of the Aviation Center and Commandant of the Aviation School. Ozark Army Airfield at Fort Rucker was subsequently renamed Cairns Army Airfield in his honor in January 1959. H-13 was taking off from field site when it hit a wire extended between two tents causing pilot to lose control and fly into trees.

9 December
Boeing B-52E Stratofortress, 56-0633, of the 11th Bomb Wing, crashes near Altus AFB, Oklahoma, due to improper use of stabilizer trim during an overshoot. Returning from a routine night training mission, aircraft makes a GCA approach, requests climb to altitude for another penetration, experiences stab trim problems, crashes c. four miles from base at 23:45. Pilot Major Byard F. Baker, 39, of Azle, Texas, ejects; eight other crew die.

16 December
Convair RB-58A Hustler, 58-1008 accepted and delivered to the 6592nd Test Squadron, 43rd Bomb Wing, for pod and suitability testing during October: 1958. Crashed this date, the first B-58 accident, 38 nautical miles (70 km) NNE of Cannon AFB, New Mexico, due to loss of control during normal flight when auto trim and ratio changer were rendered inoperative due to an electrical system failure. Air Force pilot Maj. Richard Smith killed; AF Nav/bombardier Lt. Col. George Gradel, AF DSO Capt. Daniel Holland, both survive.

== 1959 ==
1959
The fourth of five pre-production Dassault Étendard IVM, and the first to receive the keel housing the anti-roll antenna telemetry, is destroyed in a ground fire.

4 January
Single-engine de Havilland Canada UC-1A Otter cargo aircraft, BuNo 144673, c/n 163, from VX-6, participating in Operation Deep Freeze IV, crashed during takeoff at Marble Point, Antarctica, about 50 miles (80 km) from McMurdo Station. "As the aircraft departed the Marble Point runway it made a very steep left turn and the left wing hit a small knoll. The aircraft cart-wheeled and crashed." Lieutenant Harvey E. Gardner and Lieutenant (Junior Grade) Lawrence J. Farrell died. Joe Baugher lists crash date as 1 April 1959.

9 January
A U.S. Air Force F-89 Scorpion with two crew members crashes minutes after takeoff from Portland Air National Guard Base, Oregon. Crew were pilot Powell and radar observer James Long. Powell transmitted a distress call after takeoff. The jet crashed about 3.75 miles (6.04 km) northeast of the airport just north of U.S. Route 830 (now State Route 14), Vista Road, Clark County, Washington. The jet carried 42 live "Mighty Mouse" unguided missiles when it went down.

14 January
During its final approach to Naval Air Station Key West, Florida, a Royal Canadian Navy McDonnell F2H-3 Banshee, BuNo 126488, Sqn. No. 105 of VF-870, suffers a double engine flameout and crash-lands in a nearby lagoon, shearing off the landing gear and starboard wing. Pilot SubLt. Jean Veronneau only suffers minor injuries, but the fighter is written off. The crash is attributed to fuel starvation caused by the pilot's failure to transfer fuel from the auxiliary wingtip fuel tanks to the main fuselage tank earlier in the flight.

22 January
A Boeing KB-50 Superfortress takes off from England AFB, Louisiana, one of seven on an early morning refuelling mission with fighters, but the pilot radios that he has a problem and is returning to the field. The tanker crashes shortly thereafter, killing all six crew, with the tail section on the right-of-way of the Texas and Pacific Railway at Alexandria, Louisiana.

22 January
"HONOLULU, Jan. 22 (AP) – An air force Super-Constellation lost both of its port engines but the pilot landed the craft safely one hour later, using only the two starboard engines. Nineteen airmen were aboard the C-121 radar plane which was on a reconnaissance flight. Maj. Earl W. Bierer, the pilot, said the No. 2 engine dropped off, damaging the propeller of No. 1."

26 January
Tenth of 13 North American X-10s, GM-52-3, c/n 10, on Navaho X-10 Drone BOMARC target mission 3, out of Cape Canaveral, Florida. The X-10 is launched with only one electrical generator due to a lack of any remaining spares. As it headed out over the ocean, that generator fails. It loses all electrical power, and crashes into the ocean 105 km downrange. This is the final X-10 mission, the Navaho program having been cancelled on 13 July 1957.

3 February
Boeing B-47E-50-LM Stratojet, 52-3371, of the 384th Bombardment Wing, crashes during landing near Little Rock, Arkansas. Pilot, co-pilot, and navigator killed.

4 February
USAF Boeing WB-50D Superfortress, 49-0343, weather reconnaissance aircraft, assigned to 59th Weather Reconnaissance Squadron at Kindley AFB Bermuda was lost on weather track over Atlantic with 12 killed. Crash was observed by a Japanese freighter about two hours after takeoff.

11 February
USAF Boeing B-47E Stratojet, 53-6215 crashed on take off at Goose Bay, Canada, two killed.

22 February
A US Navy McDonnell F2H-4 Banshee, 127614, of VAW-11, NAS North Island, California, crashes during bad weather en route to NAS Alameda, California, killing the pilot, Lt.(jg) James F. Wyley. Wreckage can still be found at the crash site in a rugged area of California's Santa Cruz Mountains at [37.26894,-122.13096], in the Saratoga Gap Open Space Preserve.

4 April
A Navy Grumman F-9 Cougar jet aircraft, flying from Naval Air Station Memphis, north of Memphis, TN, was flying due west at 11,000 ft when it suffered a malfunction. The pilot, Lt. Edward Holmes, set the aircraft to crash into nearby Big Lake in Mississippi County, AR, and bailed out. However, after the pilot bailed, the jet made a 180 degree turn and then crashed into the officer housing district of Blytheville Air Force Base, due west of Blytheville, AR. The crash killed one person, a civilian, 4-year-old Mary Black, and injured another, a civilian, Mrs. V.R. Bynum.

8 April
USAF test pilot Capt. Halvor M. Ekeren Jr. is killed in the crash of his Convair JF-106A-50 Delta Dart near Indian Springs AFB, Nevada. Ekeren reports an oil pressure warning light and attempts to make an emergency landing. Black smoke begins issuing from Ekeren's tailpipe, and he ejects at about 6,000 feet (1,800 m) before the plane explodes. Ekeren's parachute becomes entangled with his ejection seat, and once freed it streams behind him without opening. Ekeren dies two and a half hours later at the Nellis AFB hospital. Earlier in the year Ekeren had been one of the 32 finalists for NASA Astronaut Group 1, but ultimately was not selected.

May
During a static test firing of Martin XSM-68-1-MA Titan I, B-4, at the Martin Aircraft test facility near Denver, Colorado, a faulty liquid oxygen pump malfunctions, causing an explosion.

6 May
Boeing B-47E-75-BW Stratojet, 51-7041, of the 306th Bomb Wing aborts takeoff at MacDill AFB, Florida, burns to right of runway. Three crew escape but co-pilot is killed.

14 May
Convair YB/RB-58A-10-CF Hustler, 58-1012, c/n 19, of the 43rd Bomb Wing, destroyed by fire at the Convair plant, Carswell AFB, Texas. Fuel leak on the ramp during refuelling followed by accidental ignition kills two Convair ground support personnel.

20 May
A USAF Lockheed C-130A Hercules 57-0468, c/n 3175 overshot the runway at Ashiya AB, Japan. The pilot tried to pull up, but the C-130 crashed into Air Force barracks. 9 fatalities.

31 May
A U.S. Marine Corps aviator, flying into NAS Glenview, Illinois, from MCAS Cherry Point, North Carolina, was killed when his Douglas AD Skyraider crashed into an adjacent cemetery after two missed approaches in conditions of zero ceiling and visibility of only three-sixteenths of a mile. Lt. William P. Byrne, 25, originally of Cleveland, was being directed by the tower on a guided control approach system on the north-south runway but was waved off twice for being too low. After the second missed approach, his aircraft veered right, hit a row of trees along Shermer Road west of the airfield, sheared off part of the porch of the home of Richard Wood, 1990 Old Willow Road, and impacted in Sunset Memorial Park. "Wheels and parts of the plane's fuselage were ripped off as it struck a huge gravestone. The remainder of the plane plowed onward for 500 feet, leveling gravestones and uprooting trees. Lt. Byrne's body was found lying near the wreckage." Lt. Byrne was graduated from Notre Dame University in 1955, and had been in the Marine Air Corps since then. He is survived by his wife, Margaret, and his daughter, Kathy, 18 months, who were staying with Mrs. Byrne's parents, Mr. and Mrs. William P. Burke, at 5904 N. Kolmar Avenue, whom the pilot was coming to visit. Byrne's widow, Jane, will eventually become Mayor of Chicago.

3 June
Second prototype North American XA3J-1 Vigilante, BuNo 154158, c/n NA247-2, crashes at Columbus, Ohio, when hydraulic and electrical failures cause loss of control. Pilot was named Hopkins.

3 June
RAF de Havilland DH-106 Comet 2R, XK663, is destroyed in a hangar fire at RAF Watton. No fatalities.

23 June
Lockheed F-104A-5-LO Starfighter, 56–742, c/n 183-1030, to General Electric Flight Test, June: 1957, performed accelerated service tests on J79 engine. Crashes this date on landing approach at Edwards AFB, California, when split flap condition occurs. Pilot ejects too low and is killed.

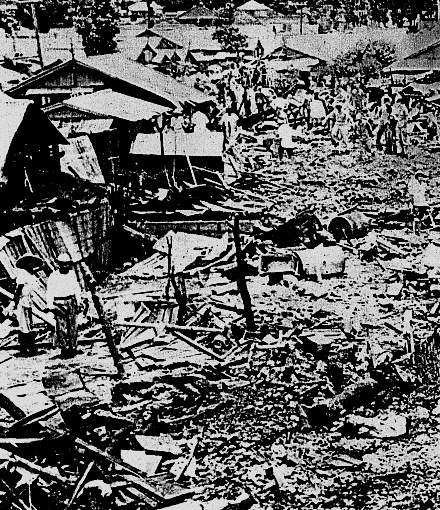
Crash site of a Kadena Air Base F-100D Super Sabre, 30 June 1959.

30 June

A USAF North American F-100D-25-NA Super Sabre, 55-3633A, c/n 223–315, from Kadena Air Base, Okinawa crashes into a nearby elementary school, killing 11 students plus six residents from the local neighborhood.

July
Third production Avro Vulcan, XA891, fitted with revised wing leading edge and used as engine testbed for Bristol Olympus 200, crashes at Yorkshire, but crew escapes unhurt.

6 July
A USAF Douglas C-124A-DL Globemaster II, 49-254A, c/n 43183, Jumbo 14, of the 3d Strategic Support Squadron, Strategic Air Command, Barksdale AFB, Louisiana, is involved in a Broken Arrow when it crashes on takeoff from that base at 14:11 CST, two minutes after the start of the takeoff roll, coming down 3,300 feet (1,000 m) south and slightly to the right of runway 14. The cargo load of an unspecified number and type of nuclear weapons was to be transported to Little Rock AFB, Arkansas. One weapon was destroyed by the post-crash fire which also burned out the airframe. No nuclear or high explosive detonation occurred, and contamination was limited to a confined area directly below the weapon. Six flight crew of crew R-41, and one substitution, all survived the crash. Although they denied any knowledge of engine malfunctions during the takeoff roll, witnesses stated that one or more engines were after firing or backfired from the beginning of the roll throughout the entire flight. After approximately 6,000 feet (1,800 m) of ground roll, the airframe assumed a nose high attitude as it climbed to between 50 and 100 feet (30 m), with one or more engines after firing excessively during the climb. The aircraft leveled off briefly before again assuming a nose high attitude when it then settled back to earth amidst smoke and dust. An intense fire then broke out (the aircraft was carrying c. 5,000 gallons of fuel). After firefighters extinguished the blaze, weapons were removed using a M246 wrecker and a 40-foot (12 m) trailer.

6 July
A USAF Lockheed F-104C-5-LO Starfighter, 56-0905, of the 436th Tactical Fighter Squadron, George Air Force Base, California, suffers a right main tire failure on take off from that base. The pilot aborted and engaged the barrier dead center. The aircraft decelerated and came to rest off the right side of the overrun in the dirt. There was no fire. The pilot, Lt. Morris Ballard Larson, of the, 434th Tactical Fighter Squadron, 479th Tactical Fighter Wing, was not injured. Taking-off in formation as number 2/Wing, Lt. Larson felt the right main gear tire blow at 4,200 ft. down the runway and at c. 150 knots. He started to veer towards Lead and corrected with left brake and reduction of power to avoid collision. The pilot then aborted t/o, reducing throttle and engaging nose wheel steering and deploying drag chute. The pilot was able to keep the F-104C centered and radioed that he was taking the barrier. Aimed at the center of the barrier the pilot moved throttle to OFF. A successful barrier engagement was made and the aircraft decelerated, then veered right into the dirt just off the hard overrun surface. The pilot engaged the fuel shut off switch, opened the canopy and evacuated without injury.

21 July
To celebrate the 50th anniversary of Louis Blériot's flight across the English Channel, the Daily Mail announces a Paris-London, or London-Paris race, on 25 May 1959. On this date, an Armee de l'Air Sud Aviation Vautour, with noted French Resistance heroine Colette Duval aboard as a passenger, touches down not at RAF Biggin Hill, but at the disused Battle of Britain airfield at RAF Kenley seven miles (11 km) away. With only an 800-yard (730 m) runway, the twin-jet bomber overruns and is damaged although both occupants escape injury.

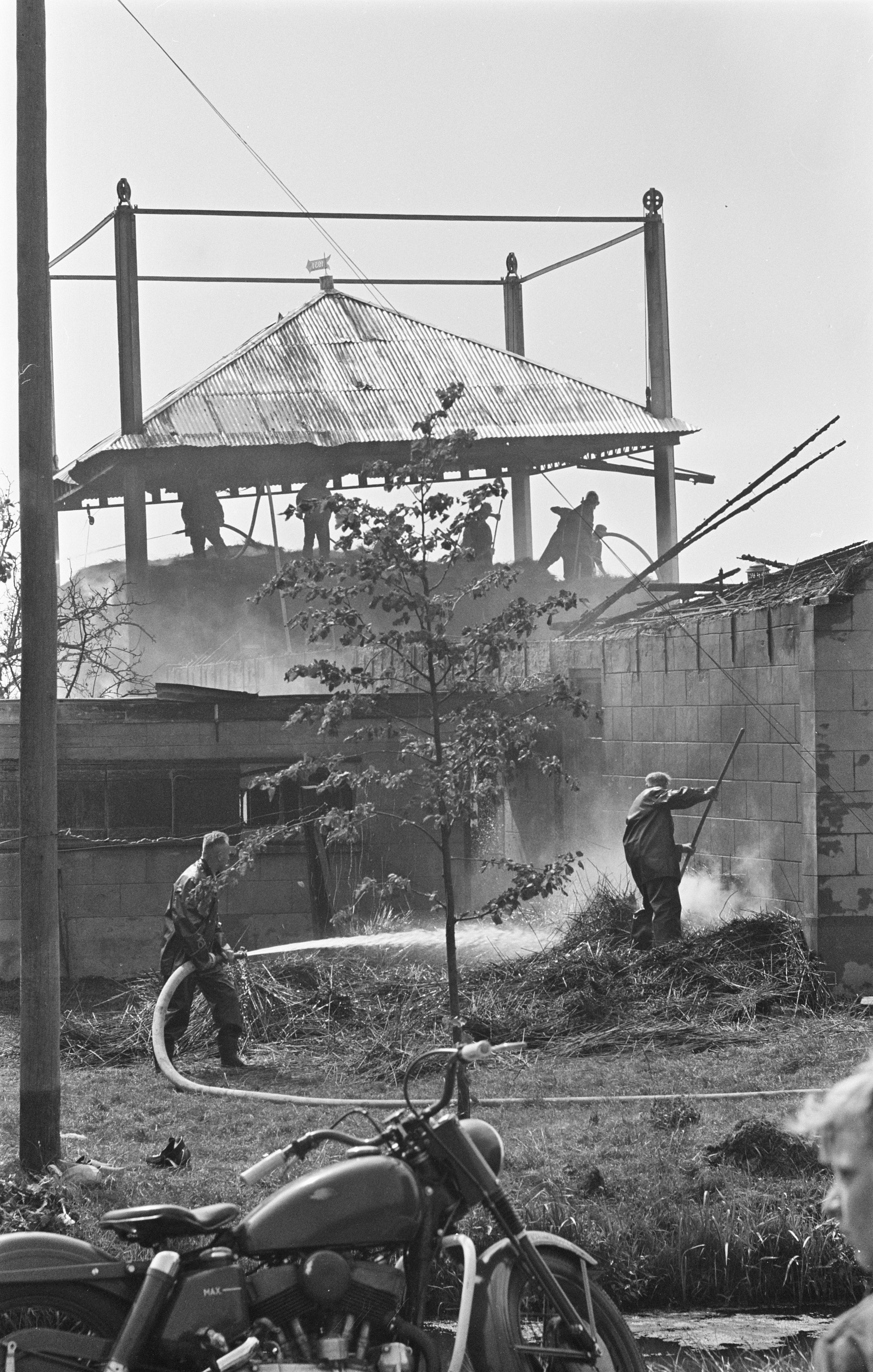
On 21 July 1959 a Hunter crashed in Nieuwkoop where a farm was burned down.

21 July
A Hunter VII of the Dutch Royal Air Force crashed in Nieuwkoop. At a night of 10000 feet an engine failed. While trying to elevate an explosion occurred. Due to the crash a farm burned down. The two pilots could escape before the crash, one was injured. A livestock of 20 pigs were killed.

26 July
A Vought F8U-1 Crusader, BuNo 143696, from VMF-122, MAG-32, MCAS Beaufort, South Carolina, was passing through 47,000 feet (14,000 m) when the engine seized. The ram air turbine did not deploy and the pilot lost control of the aircraft causing him to eject from that altitude. Lt. Col. William H. Rankin, then commanding officer of the squadron earned a place in the Guinness Book of Records by surviving the longest recorded parachute descent in history. Leader of a flight of two aircraft, the second piloted by Lt. Herbert Nolan, he had ejected into a violent thunderstorm over the South Carolina coast which caused his descent to last 40 minutes vice the expected 11 minutes, finally coming down in North Carolina, near Ahoskie. In 1960 he published his account of the experience in a book, "The Man Who Rode the Thunder".

29 July
Royal Navy Fairey Gannet AS.4, XA465, 'C 234', cannot lower undercarriage, makes power-on deck belly landing into crash barrier on HMS Centaur. Crew okay but airframe written off, salvaged in Singapore, ending up on fire dump at Sembawang.

1 August
In what was intended to be a routine NACA flight but turns out to be the final flight ever of a North American F-107A, the second accident involving the type occurs when pilot Scott Crossfield cannot get 55-5120 to lift off of the dry lakebed at Edwards AFB, California due to improperly set stabilizer trim. Nosewheel tires blow, pilot aborts take-off, tries to taxi airframe into the wind when the left main gear catches fire, airframe suffers fire damage, F-107 flight program ends. Airframe of 55–5120 cut up at Edwards, fuselage shipped to Sheppard AFB, Texas, for use as fire training aid.

10 August
A Royal Canadian Air Force Canadair F-86 Sabre of the Golden Hawks aerobatic team overshot when landing at McCall Airfield, Alberta, with the rest of the team and collided with a Piper Pacer about 2 miles (3.2 km) west of the field. Pilot of the Sabre and two occupants of the Pacer were killed.

14 August
Martin XSM-68-1-MA Titan I missile B-5, 57–2692, explodes on launchpad at Launch Complex 19 during sub-orbital flight, Cape Canaveral, Florida, when its tie-down bolts explode prematurely as the vehicle builds up thrust. An umbilical generates a "no-go" signal prompting an engine-kill signal from the flight controls and the Titan loses all thrust, falls back through the launcher ring and explodes. The umbilical tower is damaged in the ensuing fire.

16 September
A Convair YB-58A-10-CF Hustler, 58-1017, c/n 24, of the 43rd Bomb Wing, is totally destroyed by fire following an aborted take-off from Carswell Air Force Base, Fort Worth, Texas. The loss was directly attributed to tire failure, followed by disintegration of the wheel. Sturdier tires and new wheels will be retrofitted to the type to address this problem.

24 September
A Lockheed U-2C, 56-6693, Article 360, of the SAC's 4028th Strategic Reconnaissance Squadron (SRS), Detachment C, out of Atsugi Air Force Base, Japan, and clandestinely operated by the CIA, runs out of fuel and pilot Tom Crull makes an emergency landing at the civilian airfield at Fujisawa, damaging belly. The black-painted aircraft with no identity markings attracts curious locals, and officials and military police are quickly dispatched to cordon off the area. This they do at gunpoint, which attracts even more attention and pictures of the highly secret U-2C soon appear in the Japanese press. Factory repaired and assigned to Det. B, this is the airframe that pilot Francis Gary Powers will be shot down in on 1 May 1960. The 20th U-2 built, it was delivered to the CIA on 5 November 1956. Used for test and development work from 1957 to May 1959. Converted to U-2C by 18 August 1959.

25 September
A United States Navy Martin P5M-2 Marlin, BuNo 135540, SG tailcode, '6', of VP-50, out of NAS Whidbey Island, Washington on Puget Sound, is forced to ditch in the Pacific Ocean, about 100 miles (160 km) west of the Washington-Oregon border after fire in the port engine, loss of electrical power. Pilot was Lt. James D. Henson of Hot Springs, Arkansas. A Betty depth bomb casing is lost and never recovered, but it was not fitted with a nuclear core. The weapon was jettisoned immediately after ditching, in 1430 fathoms of water. Coast Guard cutter USCGC Yocona, out of Astoria, Oregon, rescues all ten crew after ten hours in a raft. A Coast Guard Grumman UF Albatross amphibian directed the vessel to the crew. The press was not notified at the time.

1 October
English Electric test pilot Johnny W.C. Squier, flying prototype two-seat English Electric Lightning T.4, XL628, suffers structural failure, ejects at Mach 1.7, becoming first UK pilot to eject above the speed of sound. Radar tracks the descending fighter, but not the pilot as he landed in the Irish Sea, and despite an extensive search, Squier has to make his way ashore by himself after 28 hours in a dinghy. Squier passes away 30 January 2006, aged 85.

8 October
A USAF Boeing B-47E-65-BW Stratojet, 51-5248, of the 307th Bomb Wing at Lincoln AFB, Nebraska, crashes during RATO take-off, killing instructor pilot Maj. Paul R. Ecelbarger, aircraft commander 1st Lt. Joseph R. Morrisey, and navigators Capt. Lucian W. Nowlin and Capt. Theodore Tallmadge.

15 October
A USAF Boeing B-52F Stratofortress, 57-036, collides with Boeing KC-135A Stratotanker, 57-1513, over Hardinsberg, Kentucky, crashes with two nuclear weapons on board, killing four of eight on the bomber and all four tanker crew. One bomb partially burned in fire, but both are recovered intact. Bombs moved to the AEC's Clarksville, Tennessee storage site for inspection and dismantlement. Both aircraft deployed from Columbus AFB, Mississippi.

27 October
Convair YB-58 Hustler, 55-0669, crashes 7 miles (11 km) west of Hattiesburg, Mississippi; Convair pilot Everett L. Wheeler, and Convair flight engineer Michael F. Keller survive; Convair flight engineer Harry N. Blosser killed. Accident cause was loss of control during normal flight.

2 November
A Lockheed F-104 Starfighter crashed into a home in suburban Dayton, Ohio killing to young girls. The pilot, Major James W. Bradbury, had ejected and landed safely a mile from the crash site.

5 November
A small engine fire forces pilot Scott Crossfield to make an emergency landing on Rosamond Dry Lake, Edwards AFB, California, in North American X-15, 56-6671. Not designed to land with fuel on board, test craft comes down with a heavy load of propellants and breaks its back, grounding this particular X-15 for three months. Footage of this accident was later incorporated in the Outer Limits episode "The Premonition", first aired 9 January 1965.

10 November
The combination of a blizzard and a blocked runway at Malmstrom AFB, Great Falls, Montana leads to the loss of three Northrop F-89 Scorpion aircraft. During a blizzard the runway was unusable due to a Lockheed T-33 Shooting Star which had sheared its landing gear on touch down. The Scorpions and an undisclosed number of other aircraft were returning to the base low on fuel and in near zero visibility. Four were lost in two of the crashed planes while the two man crew of the third parachuted to safety. No one was injured in the T-33 incident.

30 November
A Hunter of the Dutch Royal Air Force crashed in Nispen into a farm. The 34-years old pilot died. The farm burned down. The wife and child at the farm were able to escape. The 20-animals consisting livestock didn’t survive.

2 December
A USAF Douglas VC-47D Skytrain, 43-49024, c/n 14840/26285, built as C-47B-10-DK, crashes and burns in woods 10 miles (16 km) north of Oslo, Norway, killing all four on board. There was fog in the area at the time of the accident.

4 December
On Friday, December 4, 1959, Ensign Albert Joe Hickman was practising aircraft carrier landings as part of a training mission conducted from Naval Air Station Miramar, California. When his McDonnell F3H Demon suddenly stalled, Hickman was still 2,000 feet (610 m) above ground. He could easily have ejected from the cockpit in time to save his own life. Below him, however, and directly in the path of the crippled plane was Hawthorne Elementary School, where more than 700 children were playing in the schoolyard. Hickman chose to remain in the cockpit. He somehow maneuvered the descending plane away from the school, assuring the safety – and probably saving the lives – of several hundred people. Now at an altitude of only 60 feet (18 m), he no longer had the option to eject. The plane crashed into a nearby canyon, exploding on impact, and Albert J. Hickman was killed. A school in the San Diego community of Mira Mesa was later named after him. American Legion Post 460 in San Diego, Department of California, is named the Albert J. Hickman Post.

14 December
Boeing KC-97G Stratofreighter, 53-0231, of the 384th Air Refueling Squadron, out of Westover AFB, Massachusetts, collides with a B-52 during a refueling mission at an altitude of c. 15,000 feet. The aircraft loses the whole left horizontal stabilizer and elevator, the rudder, and the upper quarter of the vertical stabilizer. Crew makes a no-flap, electrical power off landing at night at Dow AFB, Maine, seven crew okay. "Spokesmen at Dow Air Force, Bangor, said the B52 [sic] apparently 'crowded too close' and rammed a fuel boom into the tail of a 4 engined KC95 [sic] tanker plane." Aircraft stricken as beyond economical repair. Two crew on the B-52 eject, parachute safely, and are recovered by helicopters in a snow-covered wilderness area. The bomber and remaining eight crew members continue to Westover AFB, where a safe landing is made.

21 December
Two prototypes of the Tupolev Tu-105 (Samolët 105) were built with the first flying on 21 June: 1958. The second modified prototype was designated the Tu-105A (Samolët 105A), first flown 7 September 1959. On its seventh test flight, this date, Samolët 105A was lost, the radio operator successfully ejecting, the pilot Yuri Alasheev and the navigator being killed. The 105A was accepted for production as the Tupolev Tu-22B.

== See also ==
- List of accidents and incidents involving military aircraft
- List of C-130 Hercules crashes

== Notes ==
1. Unable to correlate this unit, as reported in the press, with any active USAF squadron of that era.
