= Cuban Missile Crisis =

1962 confrontation between the US and USSR

- Part of the Cold War and the aftermath of the Cuban Revolution
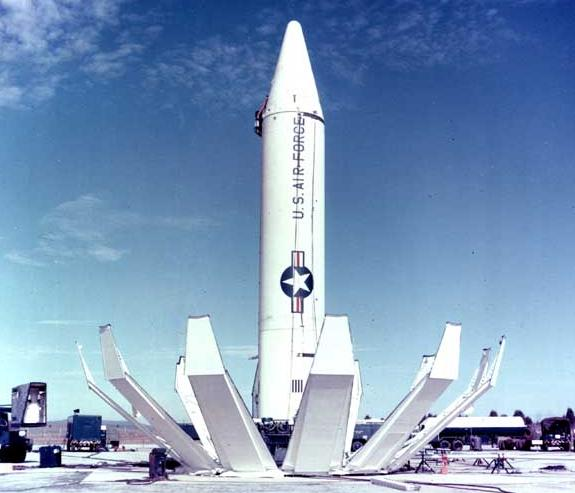
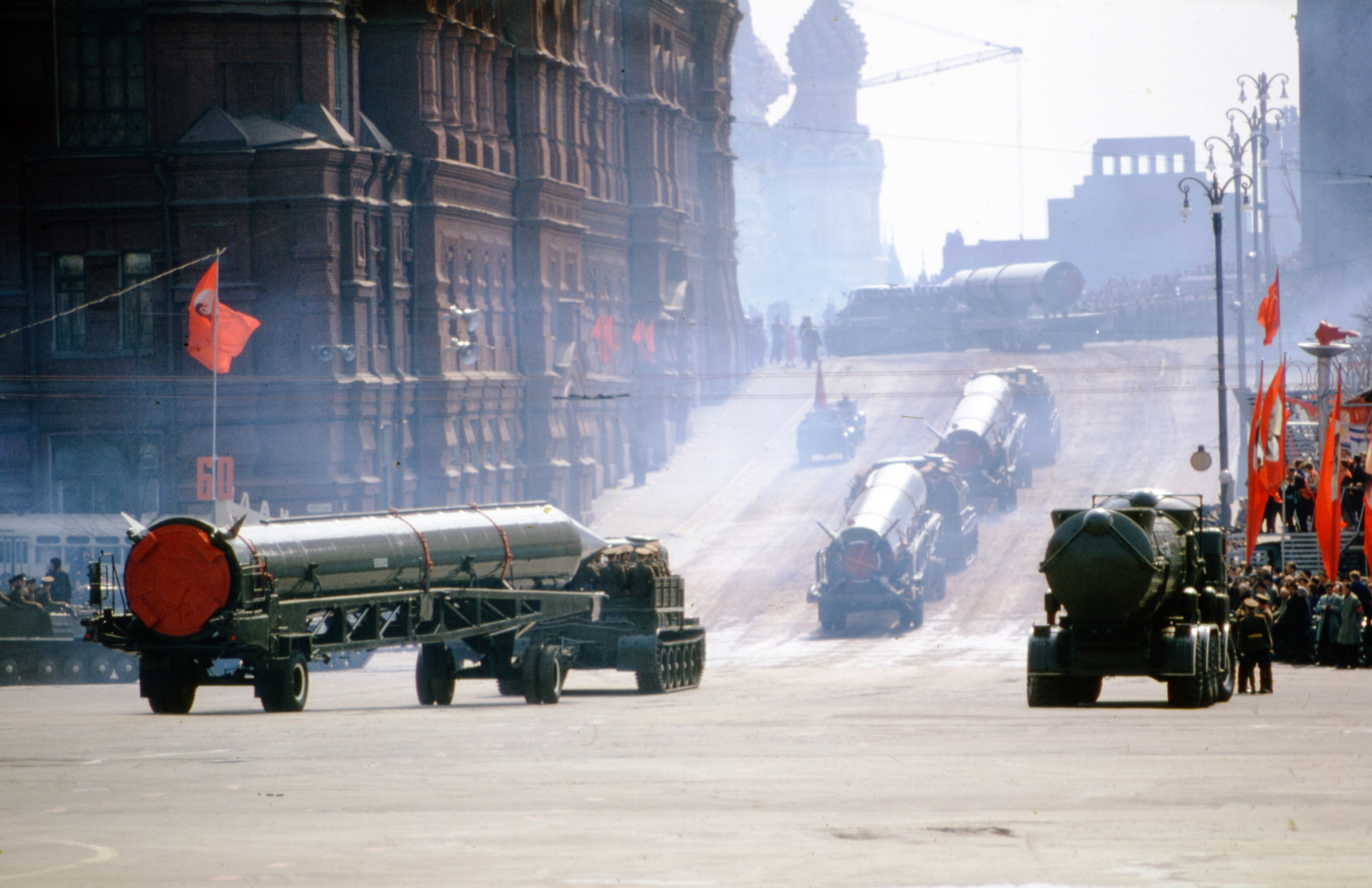
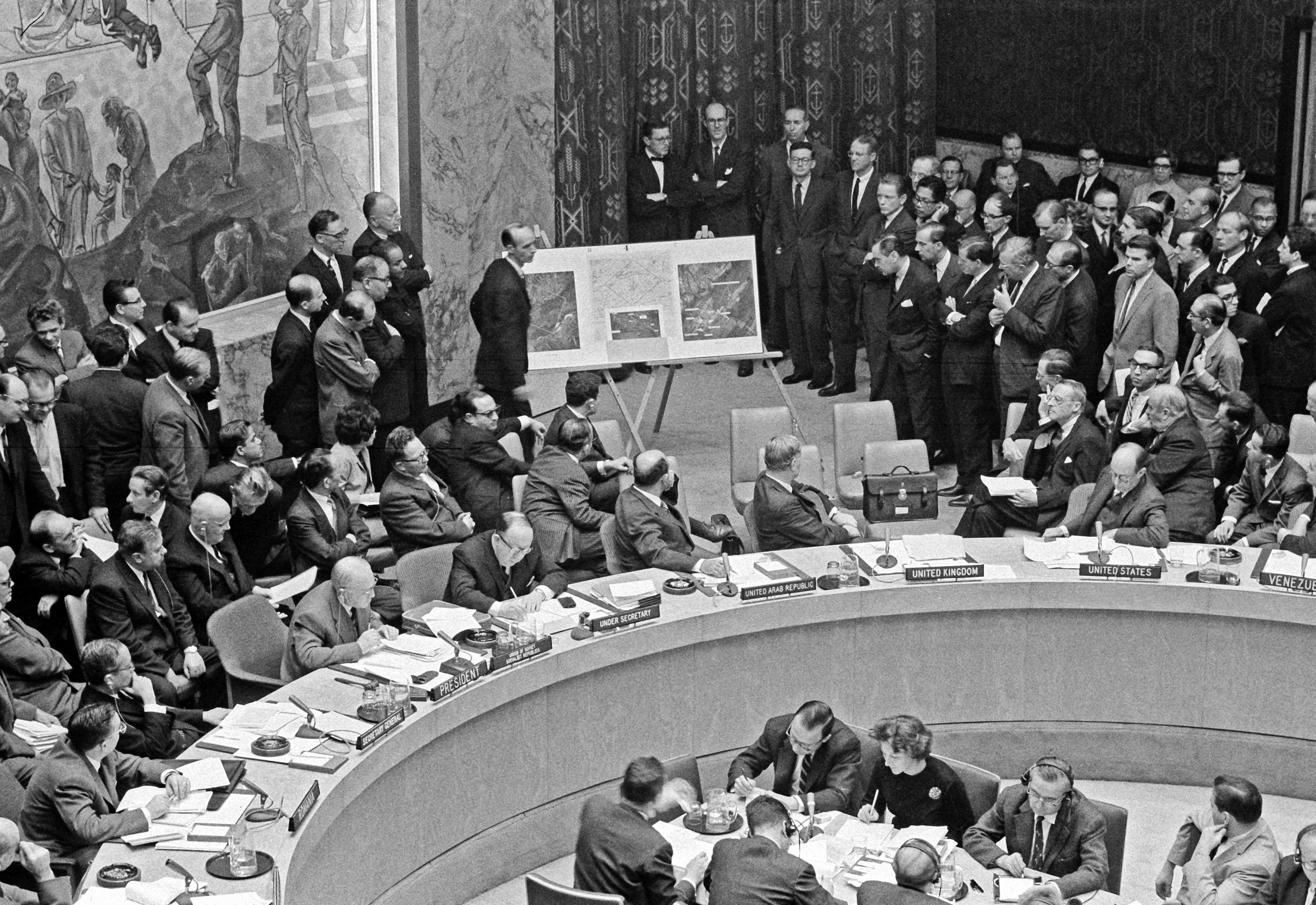
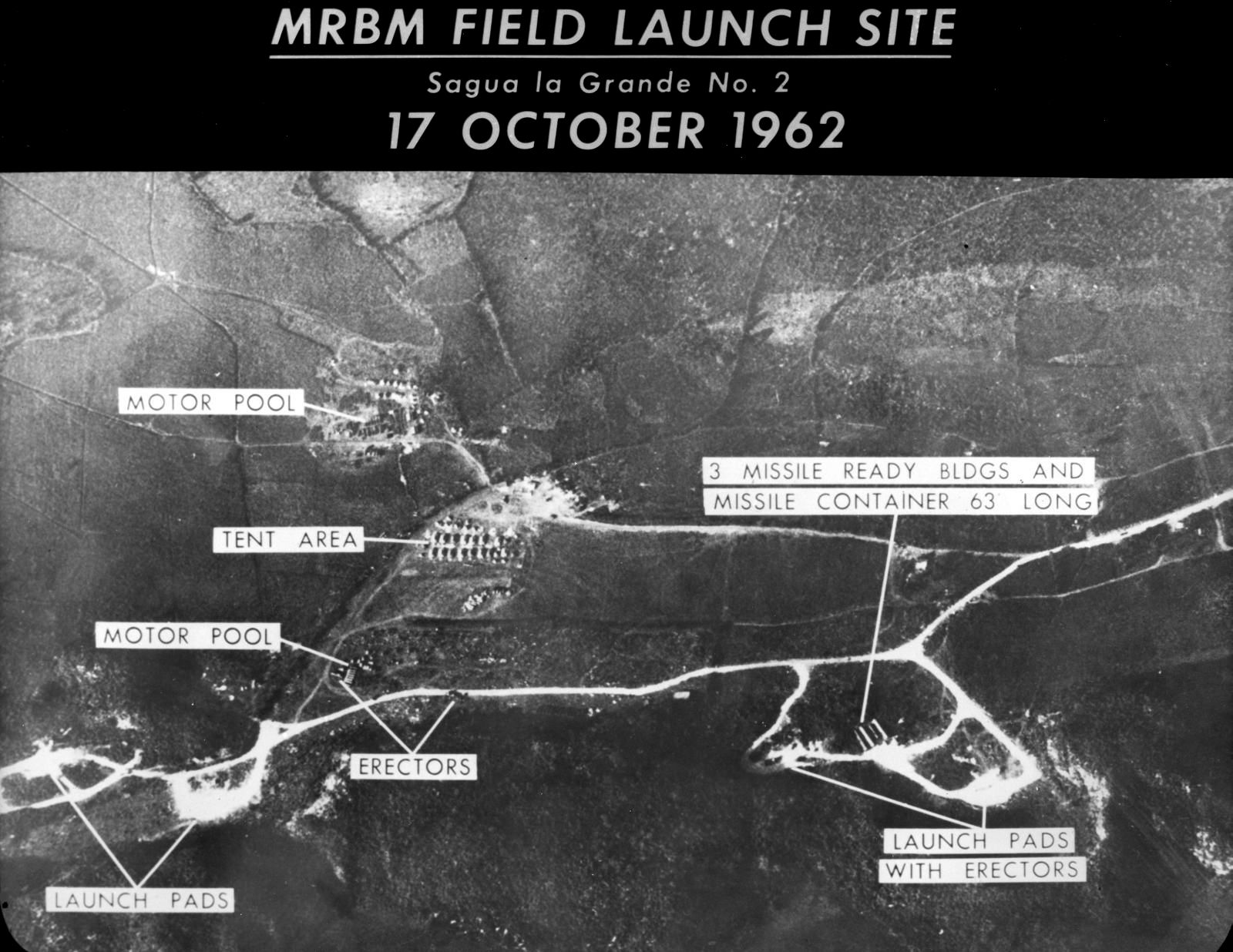
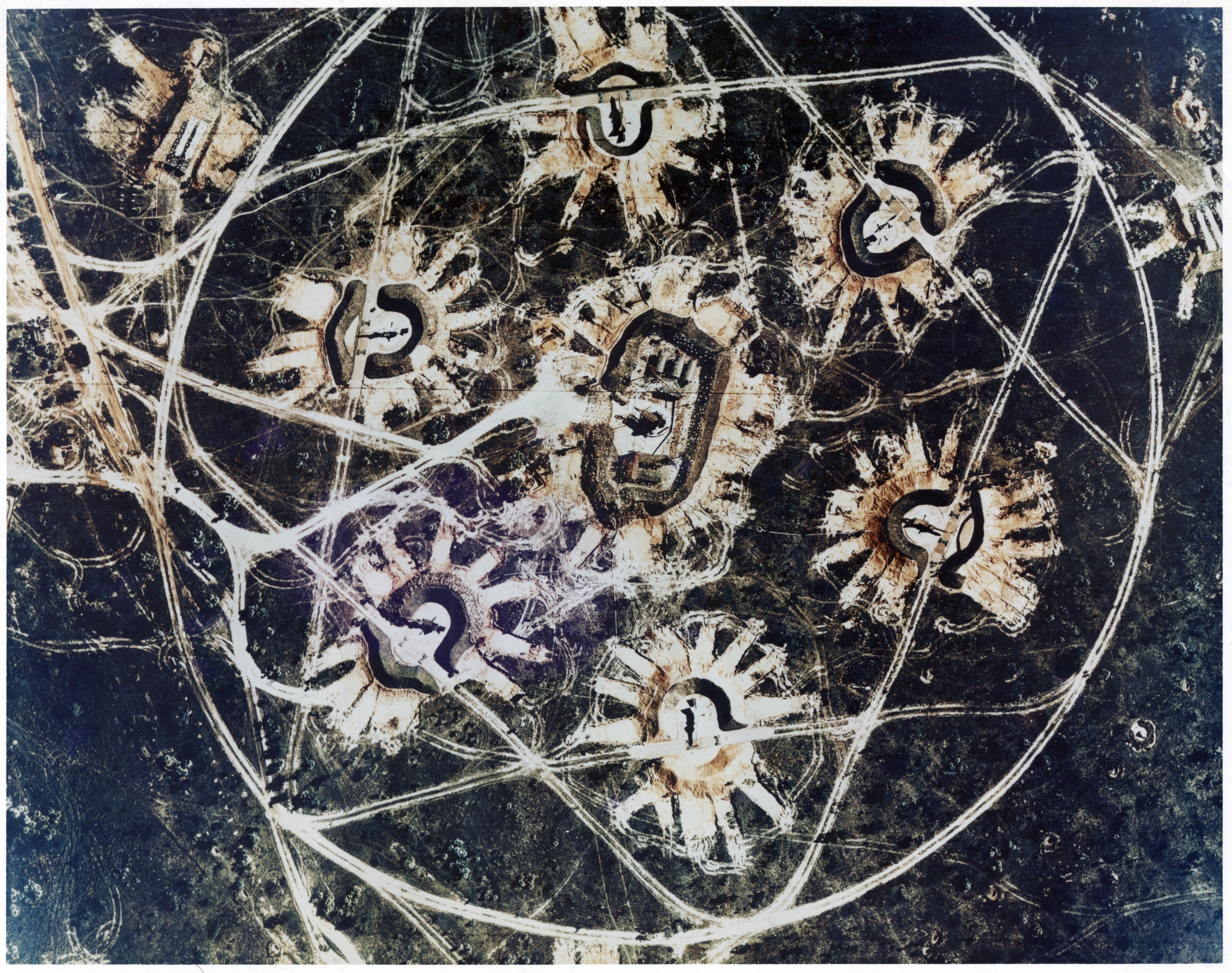
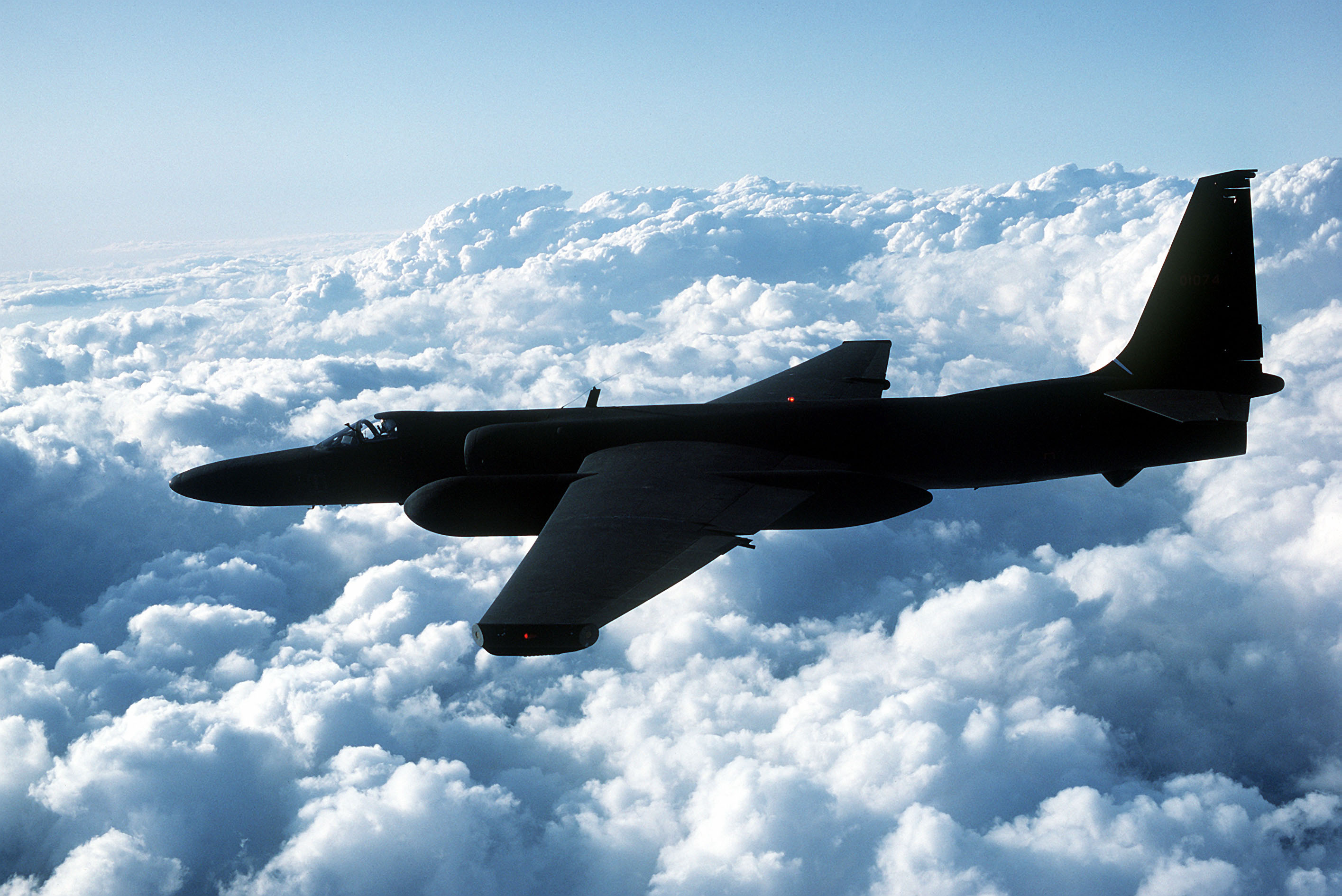
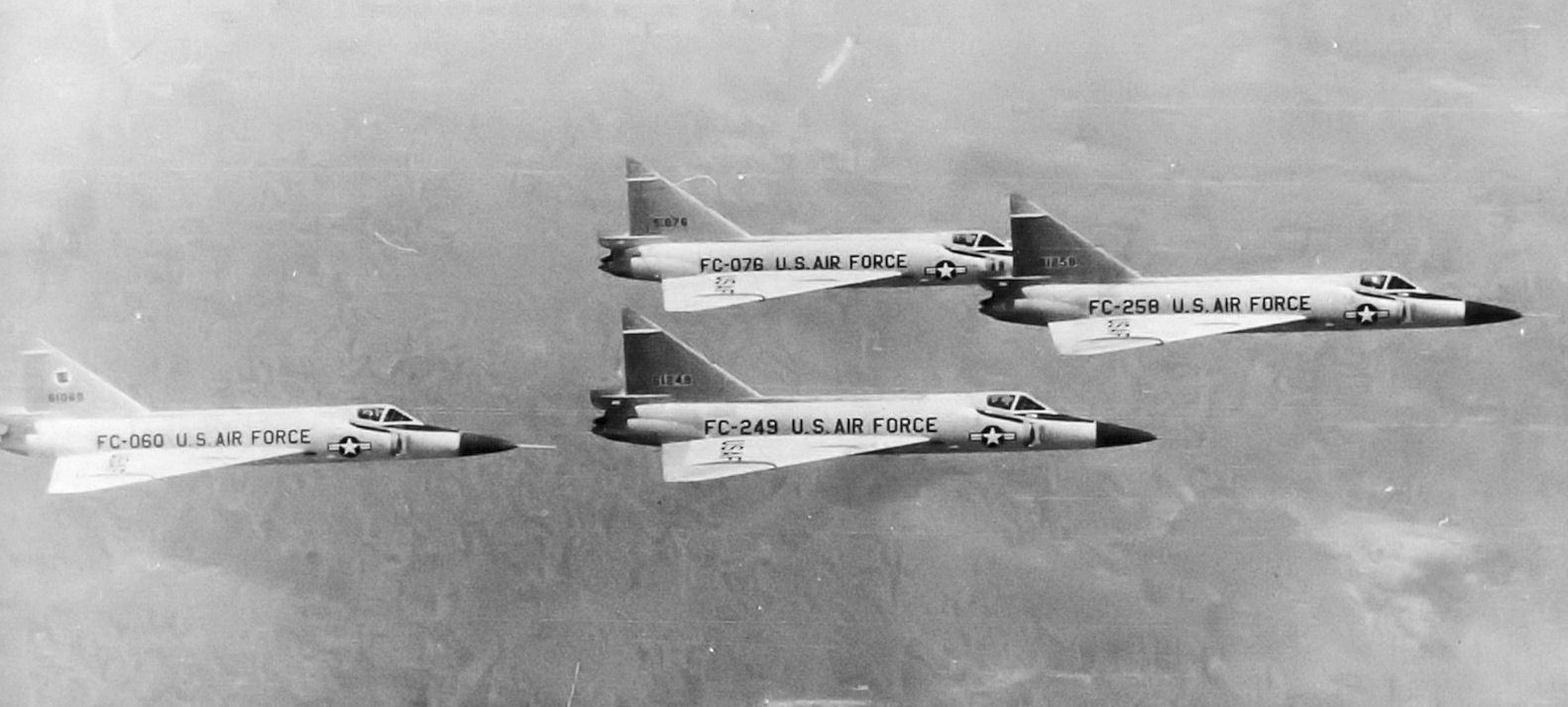
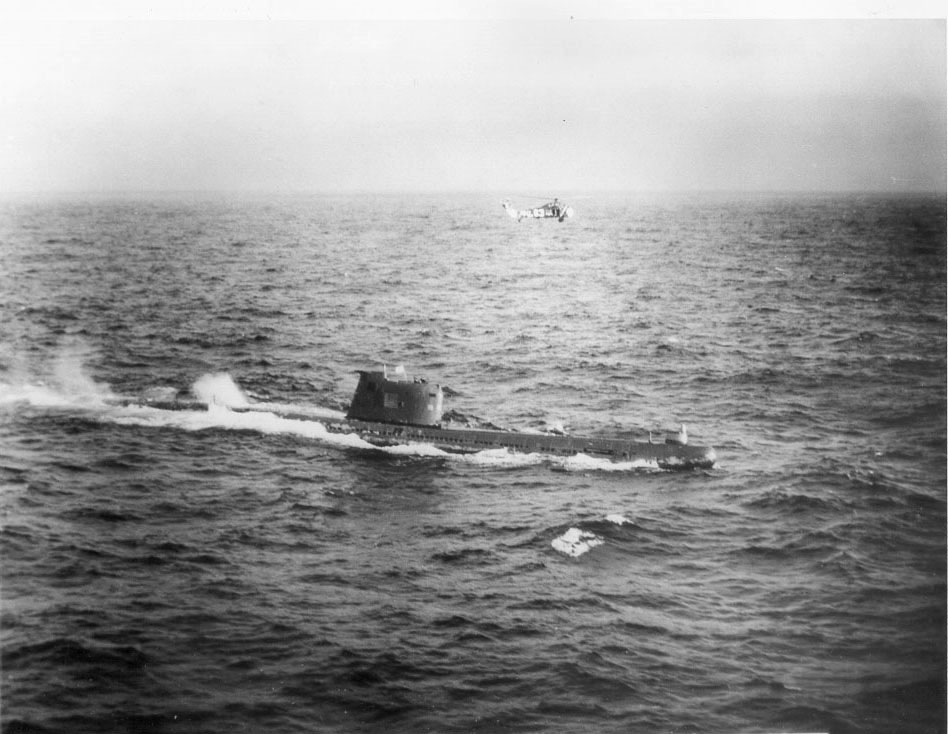
- Left to right, top to bottom: A US Jupiter medium-range ballistic missile (MRBM); Soviet R-12 MRBMs in Moscow; The US presents evidence of R-12s in Cuba to the United Nations Security Council; R-12 launch site in Cuba; Soviet surface-to-air missile site in Cuba; US U-2 spyplanes, flown and shot down during the crisis; US F-102s in Alaska, scrambled with nuclear air-to-air missiles; Soviet submarine B-59 surfaces after almost firing its nuclear torpedo on the US blockade
Date	16–28 October 1962 (naval blockade of Cuba ended on 20 November)
Location	Cuba
Result	Conflict resolved diplomatically: Publicized removal of Soviet nuclear missiles from Cuba; Non-publicized removal of American nuclear missiles from Turkey and Italy; Agreement with the Soviet Union that the United States would never invade Cuba without direct provocation; Creation of a nuclear hotline between the United States and the Soviet Union

Parties involved in the crisis
Soviet Union; Cuba	United States; United Kingdom; Italy; Turkey

Commanders and leaders
(Soviet Union) Nikita Khrushchev; (Soviet Union) Anastas Mikoyan; (Soviet Union) Rodion Malinovsky; (Soviet Union) Matvei Zakharov; (Soviet Union) Sergey Biryuzov; (Soviet Union) Issa Pliyev; (Soviet Union) Giorgi Abashvili; (Cuba) Fidel Castro; (Cuba) Raúl Castro; (Cuba) Che Guevara	(United States) John F. Kennedy; (United States) Robert McNamara; (United States) Maxwell D. Taylor; (United States) Curtis LeMay; (United States) George W. Anderson; (United States) Robert F. Kennedy; (United Kingdom) Harold Macmillan; (United Kingdom) Peter Thorneycroft; (United Kingdom) Sir Thomas Pike; (Italy) Amintore Fanfani; (Italy) Giulio Andreotti; (Turkey) Cemal Gürsel; (Turkey) İlhami Sancar

Strength
(Soviet Union) 43,000 soldiers	100,000–180,000 (estimated)

Casualties and losses
None	(United States) 1 U-2 spy aircraft lost (United States) 1 US pilot killed

Universal Newsreel about the Cuban Missile Crisis

The Cuban Missile Crisis, also known as the October Crisis in Cuba (Spanish: Crisis de Octubre), or the Caribbean Crisis (Russian: Карибский кризис, romanized: Karibskiy krizis), was a 13-day confrontation between the governments of the United States and the Soviet Union, when American deployments of nuclear missiles in the United Kingdom, Italy and Turkey were matched by Soviet deployments of nuclear missiles in Cuba. The crisis lasted from 16 to 28 October 1962. The confrontation is widely considered the closest the Cold War came to escalating into full-scale nuclear war.

In 1959, the US government deployed Thor nuclear missiles in England, an initiative known as Project Emily. In 1961 the US put Jupiter nuclear missiles in Italy and Turkey. All were within range of Moscow. The US had also trained a paramilitary force of Cuban expatriates, for a CIA-led attempt to invade Cuba and overthrow its government in April 1961. Starting in November of that year, the US government engaged in a violent campaign of terrorism and sabotage in Cuba, referred to as the Cuban Project, which continued throughout the first half of the 1960s. The Soviet administration was concerned about a Cuban drift towards China, with which the Soviets had an increasingly strained relationship. In response to these factors the Soviet and Cuban governments agreed, at a meeting between leaders Nikita Khrushchev and Fidel Castro in July 1962, to place nuclear missiles on Cuba to deter a future US invasion. Construction of launch facilities started shortly thereafter.

A U-2 spy plane captured photographic evidence of medium- and long-range launch facilities in October. US president John F. Kennedy convened a meeting of the National Security Council and other key advisers, forming the Executive Committee of the National Security Council (EXCOMM). Kennedy was advised to carry out an air strike on Cuban soil in order to compromise Soviet missile supplies, followed by an invasion of the Cuban mainland. He chose a less aggressive course in order to avoid a declaration of war. On 22 October, Kennedy ordered a naval blockade to prevent further missiles from reaching Cuba. He referred to the blockade as a "quarantine", not as a blockade, so the US could avoid the formal implications of a state of war.

An agreement was eventually reached between Kennedy and Khrushchev. The Soviets would dismantle their offensive weapons in Cuba, subject to United Nations verification, in exchange for a US public declaration and agreement not to invade Cuba again. The United States secretly agreed to dismantle all of the offensive weapons it had deployed to Turkey. All Thors in the UK were disbanded by August 1963. While the Soviets dismantled their missiles, some Soviet bombers remained in Cuba, and the United States kept the naval quarantine in place until 20 November 1962. The blockade was formally ended on 20 November after all offensive missiles and bombers had been withdrawn from Cuba. The evident necessity of a quick and direct communication line between the two powers resulted in the Moscow–Washington hotline. A series of agreements later reduced US–Soviet tensions for several years.

The compromise embarrassed Khrushchev and the Soviet Union because the withdrawal of US missiles from Italy and Turkey was a secret deal between Kennedy and Khrushchev, and the Soviets were seen as retreating from a situation that they had started. Khrushchev's fall from power two years later was in part because of the Soviet Politburo's embarrassment at both Khrushchev's eventual concessions to the US and his ineptitude in precipitating the crisis. According to the Soviet ambassador to the United States, Anatoly Dobrynin, the top Soviet leadership took the Cuban outcome as "a blow to its prestige bordering on humiliation".

== Background ==
=== Cuba–Soviet relations ===
In late 1961, Fidel Castro asked for more SA-2 anti-aircraft missiles from the Soviet Union. The request was not acted upon by the Soviet leadership. In the interval, Castro began criticizing the Soviets for lack of "revolutionary boldness", and began talking to China about agreements for economic assistance. In March 1962, Castro ordered the ousting of Anibal Escalante and his pro-Moscow comrades from Cuba's Integrated Revolutionary Organizations. This affair alarmed the Soviet leadership and raised fears of a possible US invasion. As a result, the Soviet Union sent more SA-2 anti-aircraft missiles in April, as well as a regiment of regular Soviet troops.

Historian Timothy Naftali writes that Escalante's dismissal was a motivating factor behind the Soviet decision to place nuclear missiles in Cuba in 1962. According to Naftali, Soviet foreign policy planners were concerned that Castro's break with Escalante foreshadowed a Cuban drift toward China, and they sought to solidify the Soviet-Cuban relationship through the missile basing program.

=== Cuba–US relations ===
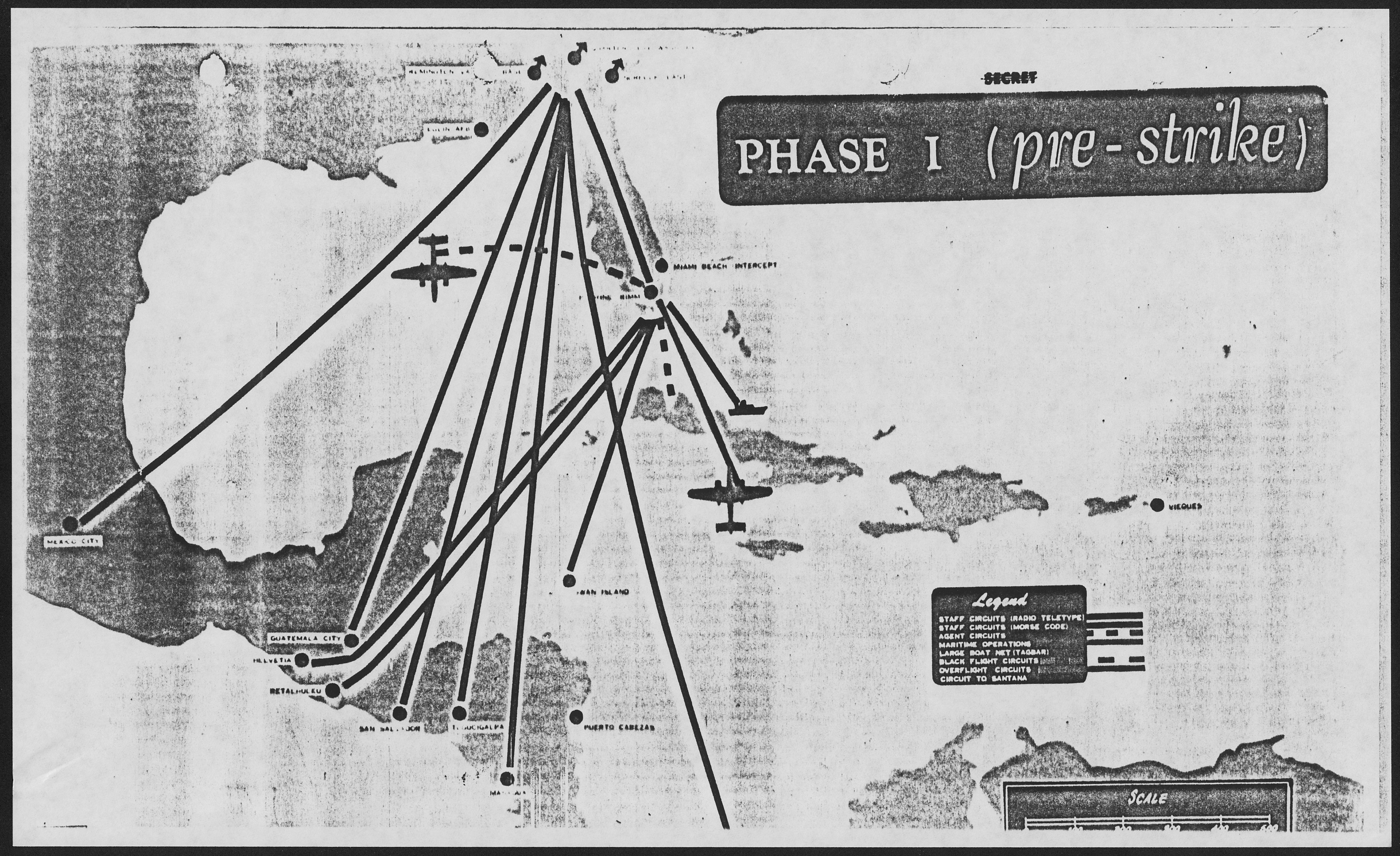
An image of the Kennedy administration's plans for the Bay of Pigs Invasion

The Cuban government regarded US imperialism as the primary explanation for the island's structural weaknesses. The US government had provided weapons, money, and its authority to the military dictatorship of Fulgencio Batista that ruled Cuba until 1958. The majority of the Cuban population were tired of the severe socioeconomic problems associated with the US domination of the country. The Cuban government was thus aware of the necessity of ending the turmoil and incongruities of US-dominated prerevolution Cuban society. It determined that the US government's demands, part of their hostile reaction to Cuban government policy, were unacceptable.

With the end of World War II and the start of the Cold War, the US government sought to promote private enterprise as an instrument for advancing US strategic interests in the developing world. It had grown concerned about the expansion of communism.

In December 1959, under the Eisenhower administration and less than twelve months after the Cuban Revolution, the Central Intelligence Agency (CIA) developed a plan for paramilitary action against Cuba. The CIA recruited operatives on the island to carry out terrorism and sabotage, kill civilians, and cause economic damage. At the initiative of the CIA Deputy Director for Plans, Richard Bissell, and approved by the new President John F. Kennedy, the US launched the attempted Bay of Pigs Invasion in April 1961 using CIA-trained forces of Cuban expatriates. The complete failure of the invasion, and the exposure of the US government's role before the operation began, was a source of diplomatic embarrassment for the Kennedy administration. Former President Eisenhower told Kennedy that "the failure of the Bay of Pigs will embolden the Soviets to do something that they would otherwise not do."

Following the failed invasion, the US massively escalated its sponsorship of terrorism against Cuba. Starting in late 1961, using the military and the CIA, the US government engaged in an extensive campaign of terrorism against civilian and military targets on the island. The terrorist attacks killed significant numbers of civilians. The US armed, trained, funded and directed the terrorists, most of whom were Cuban expatriates. Terrorist attacks were planned at the direction, and with the participation, of US government employees and launched from US territory. The attacks would continue through 1965. In January 1962, US Air Force General Edward Lansdale described the plans to overthrow the Cuban government in a top-secret report, addressed to Kennedy and officials involved with Operation Mongoose. CIA agents or "pathfinders" from the Special Activities Division were to be infiltrated into Cuba to carry out sabotage and organization, including radio broadcasts. In February 1962, the US launched an embargo against Cuba, and Lansdale presented a 26-page, top-secret timetable for implementation of the overthrow of the Cuban government, mandating guerrilla operations to begin in August and September. "Open revolt and overthrow of the Communist regime" was hoped by the planners to occur in the first two weeks of October.

The terrorism campaign and the threat of invasion were crucial factors in the Soviet decision to place nuclear missiles on Cuba, and in the Cuban government's decision to accept. The US government was aware at the time, as reported to the president in a National Intelligence Estimate, that the invasion threat was a key reason for the increased Soviet military presence.

=== US–Soviet relations ===
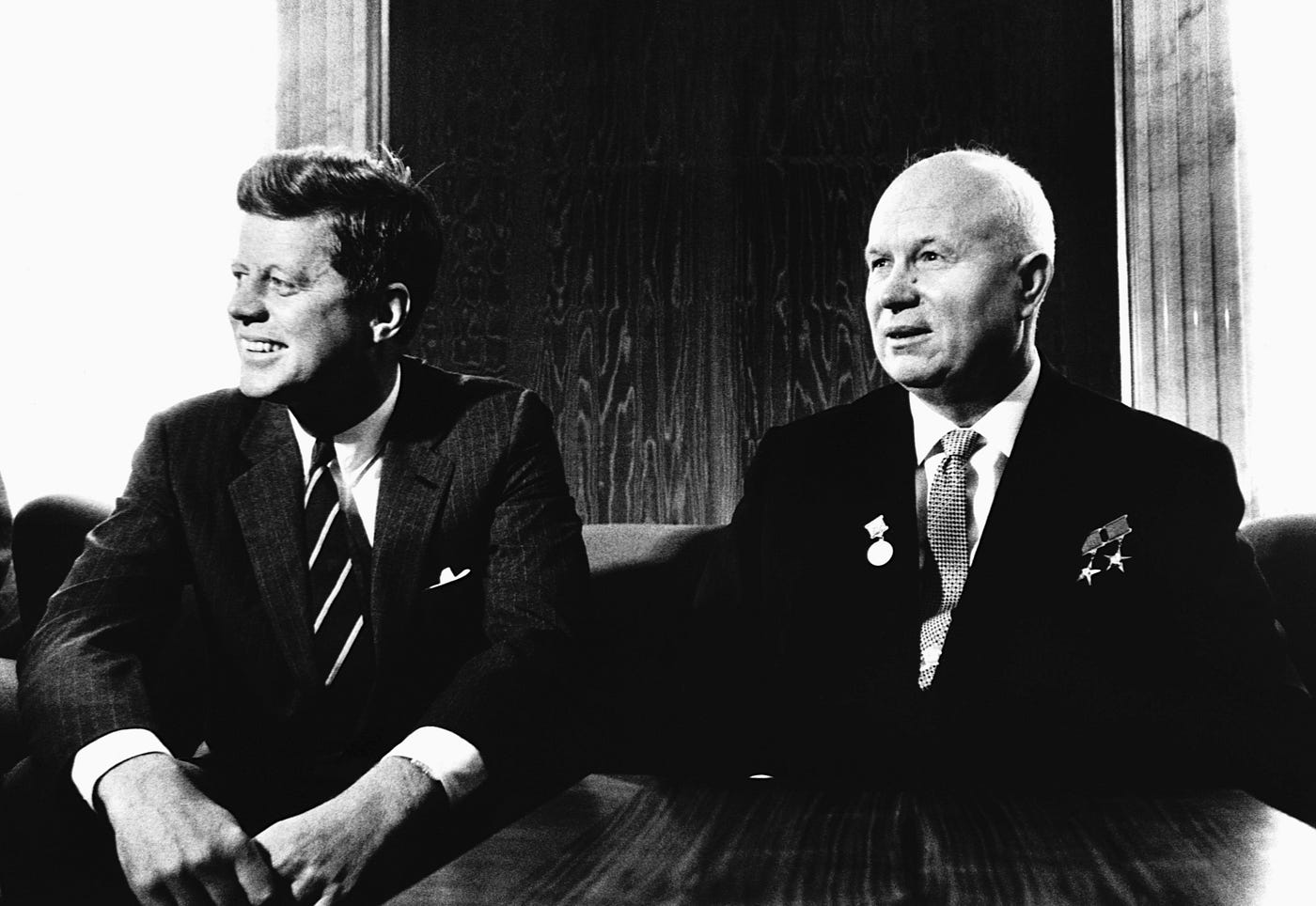
John F. Kennedy (1917–1963) and Nikita Khrushchev (1894–1971) in Vienna, Austria in May 1961

When Kennedy ran for president in 1960, one of his key election issues was an alleged "missile gap" with the Soviets. In fact the US at that time was ahead of the Soviets and by an increasingly wide margin. In 1961 the Soviets had four R-7 Semyorka intercontinental ballistic missiles (ICBMs); by October 1962, some intelligence estimates indicated a figure of 75.

The US had 170 ICBMs and was quickly building more. It also had eight George Washington- and Ethan Allen-class ballistic missile submarines, with the capability to launch 16 Polaris missiles, each with a range of 2,500 nautical miles (4,600 km). The Soviet First Secretary, Nikita Khrushchev, increased the perception of a 'missile gap' when he boasted to the world that the Soviets were building missiles "like sausages", but Soviet missile numbers and capabilities were nowhere close to his assertions. The Soviet Union had medium-range ballistic missiles in quantity, about 700, but they were unreliable and inaccurate. The US had a considerable advantage in total number of nuclear warheads (27,000 against 3,600) and in the technology required for accurate delivery. The US also led in missile defensive capabilities, naval and air power. The Soviets had a two-to-one advantage in conventional ground forces, particularly in field guns and tanks in the European theatre.

Khrushchev also thought Kennedy was weak. This impression was confirmed by the President's response during the Berlin Crisis of 1961, particularly to the building of the Berlin Wall by East Germany to prevent its citizens from emigrating to the West. The half-hearted nature of the Bay of Pigs invasion reinforced his impression that Kennedy was indecisive and, as one Soviet aide wrote, "too young, intellectual, not prepared well for decision making in crisis situations... too intelligent and too weak". Speaking to Soviet officials in the aftermath of the crisis, Khrushchev said, "I know for certain that Kennedy doesn't have a strong background, nor, generally speaking, does he have the courage to stand up to a serious challenge." He told his son Sergei that on Cuba, Kennedy "would make a fuss, make more of a fuss, and then agree".

== Prelude ==
=== Conception ===
In May 1962, Soviet First Secretary Nikita Khrushchev decided to counter the growing lead of the US in developing and deploying strategic missiles by placing Soviet intermediate-range nuclear missiles in Cuba, despite the misgivings of the Soviet Ambassador in Havana, Alexandr Ivanovich Alexeyev, who argued that Castro would not accept them. Khrushchev faced a strategic situation in which the US was perceived to have a "splendid first strike" capability that put the Soviet Union at a disadvantage. In 1962, the Soviets had only 20 ICBMs capable of delivering nuclear warheads to the US from inside the Soviet Union. Their poor accuracy and reliability raised serious doubts about their effectiveness. A newer, more reliable generation of Soviet ICBMs only became operational after 1965.

Soviet nuclear capability in 1962 placed less emphasis on ICBMs than on medium and intermediate-range ballistic missiles (MRBMs and IRBMs) which could strike American allies and most of Alaska from Soviet territory, but not the contiguous United States. As Graham Allison, the director of Harvard University's Belfer Center for Science and International Affairs, pointed out, "The Soviet Union could not right the nuclear imbalance by deploying new ICBMs on its own soil. In order to meet the threat it faced in 1962, 1963, and 1964, it had very few options. Moving existing nuclear weapons to locations from which they could reach American targets was one."

A second reason that Soviet missiles were deployed to Cuba was that Khrushchev wanted to bring West Berlin, which was controlled by the American, British and French within Communist East Germany, into the Soviet orbit. The East Germans and Soviets considered western control over a portion of Berlin to be a threat to East Germany. Khrushchev made West Berlin the central battlefield of the Cold War. He believed that if the US did nothing over the deployments of missiles in Cuba, he could force the West out of Berlin by using the missiles as a deterrent to western countermeasures in Berlin. If the US tried to bargain with the Soviets after it became aware of them, Khrushchev could demand a trade of the missiles for West Berlin. Since Berlin was strategically more important than Cuba, the trade would be a win for Khrushchev, as Kennedy recognized: "The advantage is, from Khrushchev's point of view, he takes a great chance but there are quite some rewards to it."

Thirdly, it seemed from the perspective both of the Soviet Union and of Cuba that the United States wanted to invade Cuba or increase its presence there. In view of actions which included an attempt to expel Cuba from the Organization of American States, a campaign of violent terrorist attacks on civilians which the US was carrying out on Cuba, economic sanctions against the country and an earlier attempt to invade the island, Cuban officials understood that America was trying to overrun their country. The USSR would respond by placing missiles on Cuba, which would secure the country against attack and keep it in the Socialist Bloc.

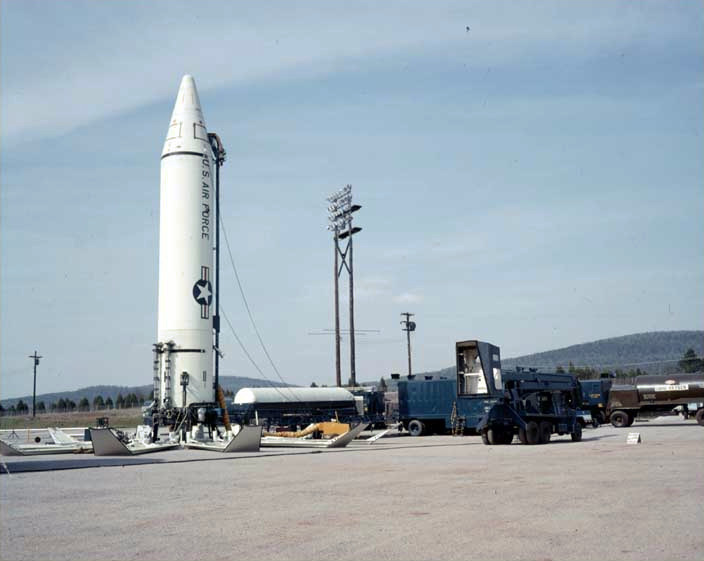
Fifteen US-built PGM-19 Jupiter missiles, with the capability to strike Moscow with nuclear warheads, were deployed in Turkey in 1961.

American missiles could have been launched from Turkey to attack the USSR before the Soviets had a chance to react. Placing nuclear missiles on Cuba would have created a balance of mutual assured destruction. If the United States launched a nuclear strike against the Soviet Union, the Soviets would have been able to react by launching a retaliatory nuclear strike against the US.

Placing nuclear missiles on Cuba was also a way for the USSR to show support for Cuba and the Cuban people who viewed the United States as a threat. The USSR had become Cuba's ally after the Cuban Revolution of 1959. According to Khrushchev, the Soviet Union's motives were "aimed at allowing Cuba to live peacefully and develop as its people desire".

Arthur M. Schlesinger Jr., a historian and adviser to Kennedy, told National Public Radio in an interview on 16 October 2002 that Castro did not want the missiles, but Khrushchev pressured him to accept them. Castro was not completely happy with the idea, but the Cuban National Directorate of the Revolution accepted them, both to protect Cuba against US attack and to aid the Soviet Union.

=== Soviet military deployments ===
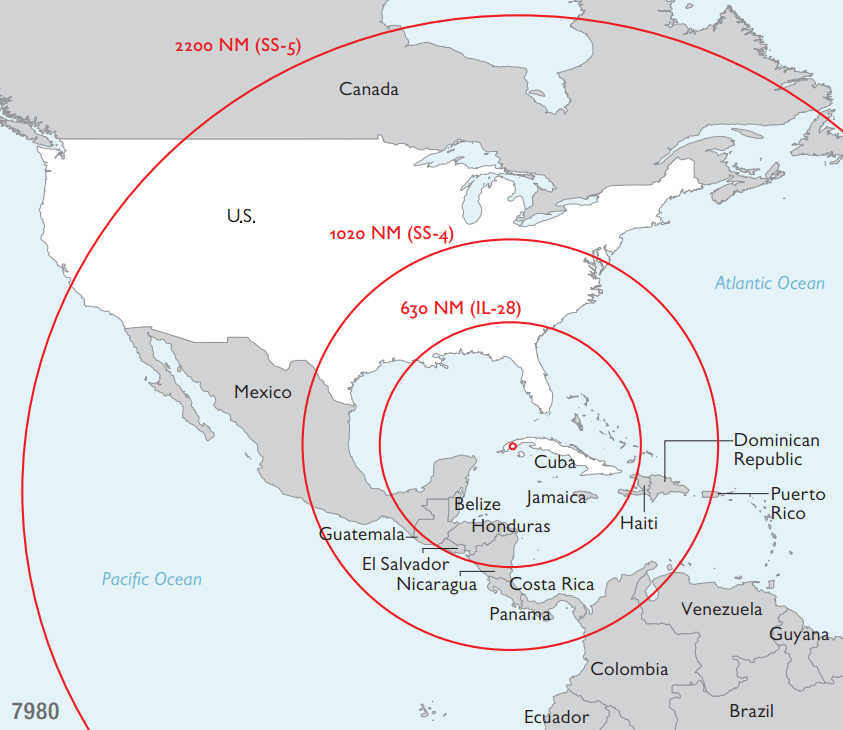
The relative ranges of the Il-28, SS-4, and SS-5 based on Cuba in nautical miles (NM)

In early 1962, a group of Soviet military and missile construction specialists accompanied an agricultural delegation to Havana and met Cuban prime minister Fidel Castro. According to one report, the Cuban leadership expected that the US would invade Cuba again and enthusiastically approved the idea of installing nuclear missiles on Cuba. According to another source, Castro objected to being made to look like a Soviet puppet, but was persuaded that missiles in Cuba would be an irritant to the US and would help the interests of the entire socialist camp. The deployment would include short-range tactical weapons with a range of 40 km, usable only against naval vessels, that would provide a "nuclear umbrella" for attacks upon the island.

By May, Khrushchev and Castro agreed to place strategic nuclear missiles secretly in Cuba. Like Castro, Khrushchev felt that a US invasion of Cuba was imminent and that to lose Cuba would do great harm to the communists, especially in Latin America. He said he wanted to confront the Americans "with more than words.... the logical answer was missiles". The Soviets maintained their tight secrecy, writing their plans in longhand, which were approved by Marshal of the Soviet Union Rodion Malinovsky on 4 July and Khrushchev on 7 July as Operation Anadyr.

Operation Anadyr entailed elaborate denial and deception, known as "maskirovka". All the planning and preparation for transporting and deploying the missiles was carried out in the utmost secrecy, with only a very few knowing the exact nature of the mission. Even the troops detailed for the mission were given misdirection by being told that they were headed for a cold region and were outfitted with ski boots, fleece-lined parkas, and other winter equipment.

Specialists in missile construction, under the guise of machine operators and agricultural specialists, arrived in July. A total of 43,000 foreign troops would ultimately be brought in. Chief Marshal of Artillery Sergey Biryuzov, Head of the Soviet Rocket Forces, led a survey team that visited Cuba. He told Khrushchev that the missiles would be concealed and camouflaged by palm trees. The Soviet troops would arrive in Cuba heavily underprepared. They did not know that the tropical climate would render ineffective many of their weapons and much of their equipment. In the first few days of setting up the missiles, troops complained of fuse failures, excessive corrosion, overconsumption of oil, and generator blackouts.

As early as August 1962, the US suspected that the Soviets were building missile facilities in Cuba. During that month, its intelligence services gathered information of sightings by ground observers of Soviet-built MiG-21 fighters and Il-28 light bombers. U-2 spy planes found S-75 Dvina (NATO designation SA-2) surface-to-air missile sites at eight different locations. CIA director John A. McCone was suspicious. Sending antiaircraft missiles into Cuba, he reasoned, "made sense only if Moscow intended to use them to shield a base for ballistic missiles aimed at the United States". On 10 August, he wrote a memo to Kennedy in which he guessed that the Soviets were preparing to introduce ballistic missiles into Cuba. Che Guevara himself traveled to the Soviet Union on 30 August 1962, to sign the final agreement regarding the deployment of missiles in Cuba. The visit was heavily monitored by the CIA as Guevara was being watched closely by American intelligence. While in the Soviet Union, Guevara argued with Khrushchev that the missile deal should be made public but Khrushchev insisted on total secrecy, and promised the Soviet Union's support if the Americans discovered the missiles. By the time Guevara arrived in Cuba, U-2 spy planes had already discovered the Soviet troops in Cuba.

With important Congressional elections scheduled for November, the crisis became enmeshed in American politics. On 31 August, Senator Kenneth Keating (R-New York) warned on the Senate floor that the Soviet Union was "in all probability" constructing a missile base in Cuba. He charged the Kennedy administration with covering up a major threat to the US, thereby starting the crisis. He may have received this initial "remarkably accurate" information from his friend, former congresswoman and ambassador Clare Boothe Luce, who in turn received it from Cuban exiles. A later confirming source for Keating's information may have been the West German ambassador to Cuba, who had received information from dissidents inside Cuba that Soviet troops had arrived in Cuba in early August and were seen working "in all probability on or near a missile base". The ambassador passed this information to Keating on a trip to Washington in early October. Air Force General Curtis LeMay presented a pre-invasion bombing plan to Kennedy in September, and spy flights and minor military harassment from US forces at Guantanamo Bay Naval Base were the subject of continual Cuban diplomatic complaints to the US government.

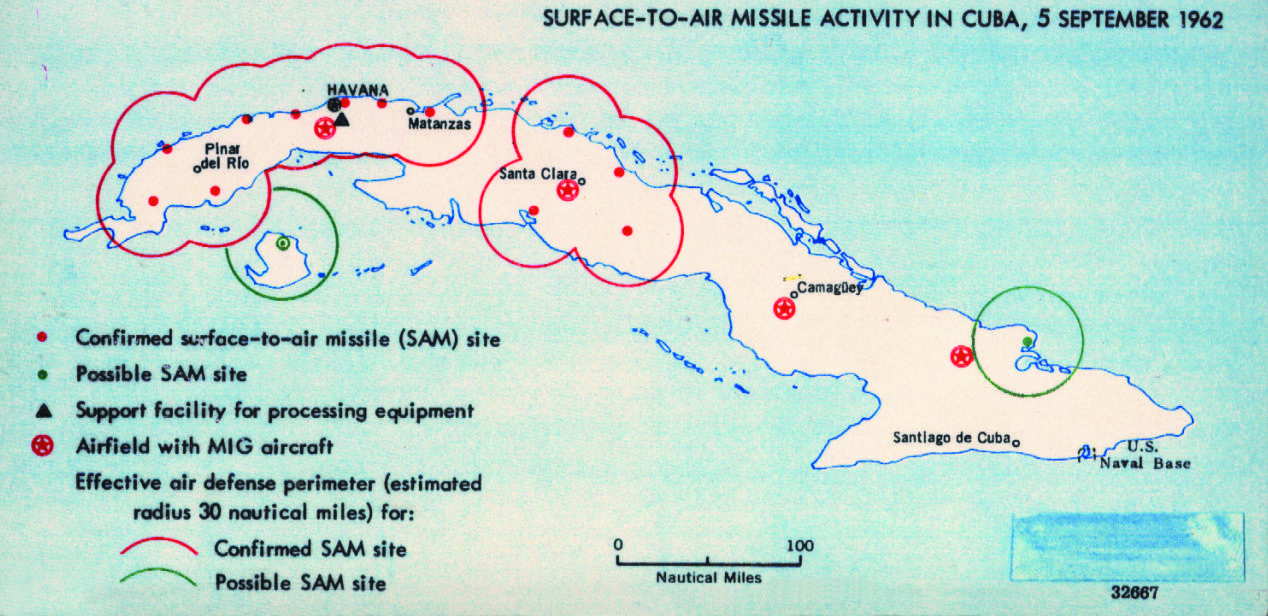
Map created by American intelligence showing all known Surface-to-Air Missile activity in Cuba, 5 September 1962

The first consignment of Soviet R-12 missiles arrived on the night of 8 September, followed by a second on 16 September. The R-12 was a medium-range ballistic missile capable of carrying a thermonuclear warhead. It was a single-stage, road-transportable, surface-launched, storable liquid propellant-fuelled missile that could deliver a megaton-class nuclear weapon. The Soviets were building nine sites, six for R-12 medium-range missiles (NATO designation SS-4 Sandal) with an effective range of 2,000 kilometres (1,200 mi) and three for R-14 intermediate-range ballistic missiles (NATO designation SS-5 Skean) with a maximum range of 4,500 kilometres (2,800 mi).

On 7 October, Cuban President Osvaldo Dorticós Torrado spoke at the UN General Assembly: "If... we are attacked, we will defend ourselves. I repeat, we have sufficient means with which to defend ourselves; we have indeed our inevitable weapons, the weapons, which we would have preferred not to acquire, and which we do not wish to employ." On 11 October in another Senate speech, Sen Keating reaffirmed his earlier warning of 31 August and stated that, "Construction has begun on at least a half dozen launching sites for intermediate range tactical missiles."

The Cuban leadership was further upset when on 20 September, the US Senate approved Joint Resolution 230, which stated that the US was determined "to prevent in Cuba the creation or use of an externally-supported military capability endangering the security of the United States". On the same day, the US announced a major military exercise in the Caribbean, PHIBRIGLEX-62, which Cuba denounced as a deliberate provocation and proof that the US planned to invade Cuba.

The Soviet leadership believed, based on its perception of Kennedy's lack of confidence during the Bay of Pigs Invasion, that he would avoid confrontation and would accept the missiles as a fait accompli. On 11 September, the Soviet Union publicly warned that a US attack on Cuba or on Soviet ships that were carrying supplies to the island would mean war. The Soviets continued the Maskirovka program to conceal their actions in Cuba. They repeatedly denied that the weapons being brought into Cuba were offensive in nature. On 7 September, Soviet Ambassador to the United States Anatoly Dobrynin assured United States Ambassador to the United Nations Adlai Stevenson that the Soviet Union was supplying only defensive weapons to Cuba. On 11 September, the Telegraph Agency of the Soviet Union (TASS: Telegrafnoe Agentstvo Sovetskogo Soyuza) announced that the Soviet Union had no need or intention to introduce offensive nuclear missiles into Cuba. On 13 October, Dobrynin was questioned by former Undersecretary of State Chester Bowles about whether the Soviets planned to put offensive weapons in Cuba. He denied any such plans. On 17 October, Soviet embassy official Georgi Bolshakov brought President Kennedy a personal message from Khrushchev reassuring him that "under no circumstances would surface-to-surface missiles be sent to Cuba."

== Missiles reported ==
Missiles placed in Cuba would enable the Soviets to target most of the continental US. The planned arsenal consisted of forty launchers. The Cuban populace observed the arrival and deployment of the missiles and hundreds of reports reached Miami. US intelligence received countless reports, many of dubious quality or even laughable, most of which could be dismissed as describing defensive missiles.

Only five reports bothered the analysts. They described large trucks passing through towns at night that were carrying very long canvas-covered cylindrical objects and could not make turns through towns without backing up and maneuvering. Defensive missile transporters, it was believed, could make such turns without undue difficulty. The reports could not be satisfactorily dismissed.

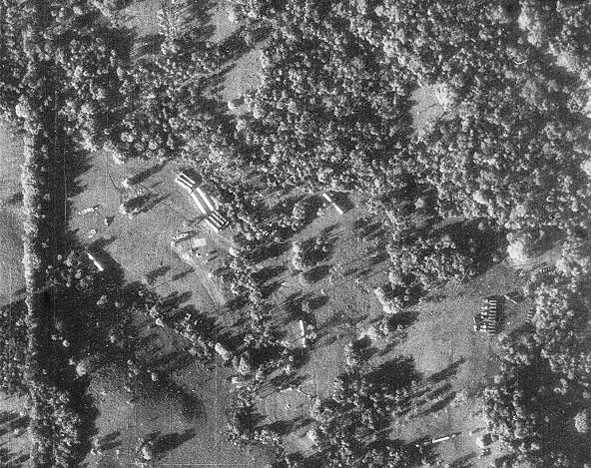
A U-2 reconnaissance photograph of Cuba, showing Soviet nuclear missiles, their transports and tents for fueling and maintenance

=== Aerial confirmation ===
The United States had been sending U-2 surveillance flights over Cuba since the failed Bay of Pigs Invasion. A pause in reconnaissance flights occurred on 30 August 1962 when a U-2 operated by the US Air Force's Strategic Air Command flew over Sakhalin Island in the Soviet Far East by mistake. The Soviets lodged a protest and the US apologized. Nine days later, a Taiwanese-operated U-2 was lost over western China to an SA-2 surface-to-air missile (SAM). US officials were worried that one of the Cuban or Soviet SAMs in Cuba might shoot down a CIA U-2, causing another international incident. In a meeting with members of the Committee on Overhead Reconnaissance (COMOR) on 10 September 1962, Secretary of State Dean Rusk and National Security Advisor McGeorge Bundy restricted further U-2 flights over Cuban airspace. The resulting lack of coverage over the island for the next five weeks became known to historians as the "Photo Gap". No significant U-2 coverage was achieved over the interior of the island during this time. US officials attempted to use a Corona photo-reconnaissance satellite to photograph reported Soviet military deployments, but the imagery acquired over western Cuba by a Corona KH-4 mission on 1 October 1962 was obscured by clouds and haze and did not provide usable intelligence. At the end of September, Navy reconnaissance aircraft photographed the Soviet ship Kasimov with large crates on its deck the size and shape of Il-28 jet bomber fuselages.

In September 1962, analysts from the Defense Intelligence Agency (DIA) noticed that Cuban surface-to-air missile sites were arranged in a pattern similar to those used by the Soviet Union to protect ICBM bases, and the DIA lobbied for resumption of U-2 flights over the island. In the past the flights had been conducted by the CIA, but pressure from the Defense Department led to that authority being transferred to the Air Force. After the loss of a CIA U-2 over the Soviet Union in May 1960, it was thought that if another U-2 were shot down, an Air Force aircraft apparently being used for a legitimate military purpose would be easier to explain than a CIA flight.

When reconnaissance missions were permitted again, on 9 October 1962, poor weather kept the planes from flying. The US first obtained U-2 photographic evidence of the Soviet missiles on 14 October 1962, when a U-2 flight piloted by Major Richard Heyser took 928 pictures on a path selected by DIA analysts, capturing images of what turned out to be an SS-4 construction site at San Cristóbal, Pinar del Río Province (now in Artemisa Province), in western Cuba.

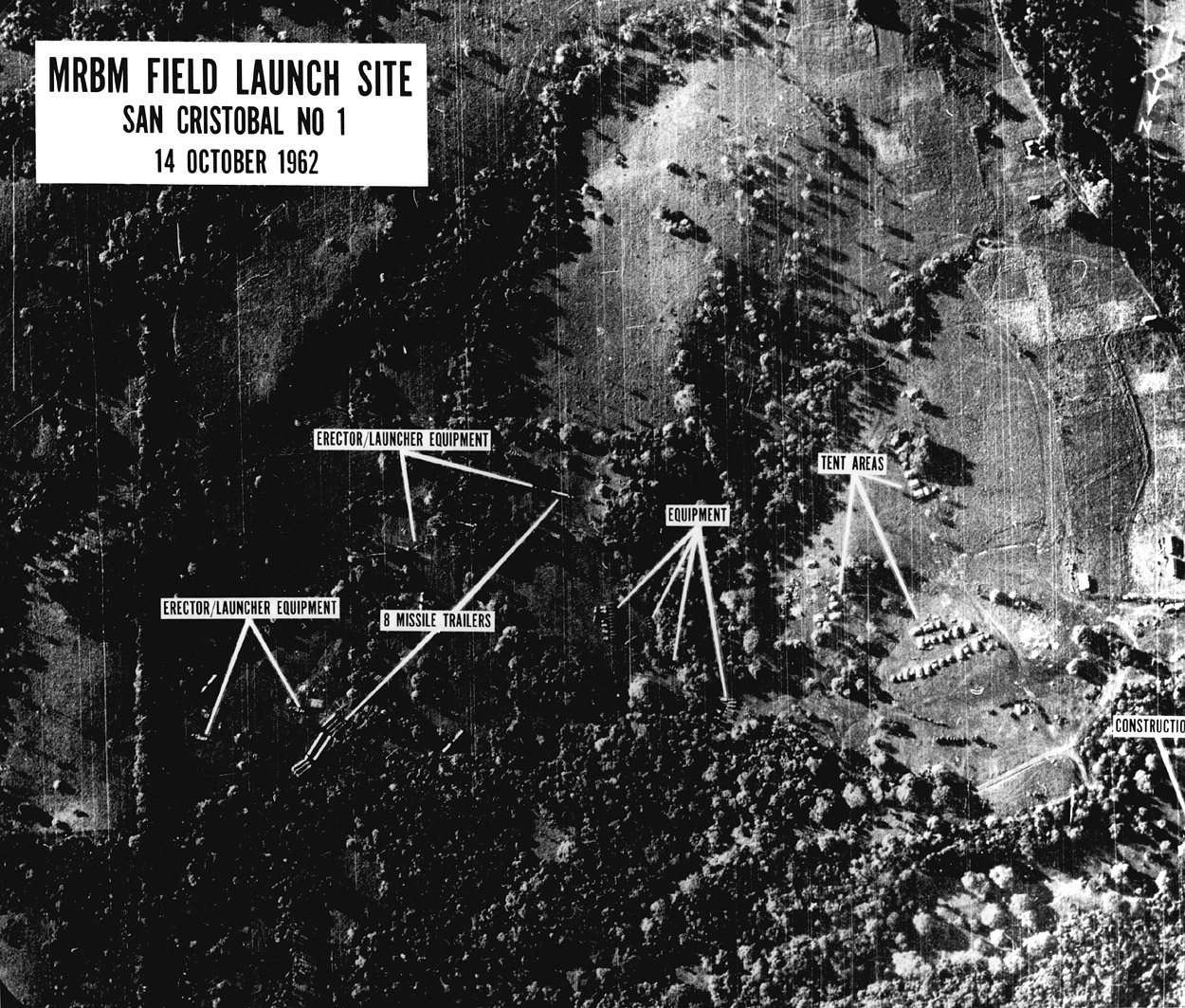
One of the first U-2 reconnaissance images of missile bases under construction shown to President Kennedy on the morning of 16 October 1962

=== President notified ===
On 15 October 1962, the CIA's National Photographic Interpretation Center (NPIC) reviewed the U-2 photographs and identified objects that appeared to be medium range ballistic missiles. This identification was made partly on the strength of reporting provided by Oleg Penkovsky, a double agent in the GRU working for the CIA and MI6. Although he provided no direct reports of Soviet missile deployments to Cuba, technical and doctrinal details of Soviet missile regiments that had been provided by Penkovsky in the months and years prior to the crisis helped NPIC analysts to identify the missiles in U-2 imagery.

That evening, the CIA notified the Department of State and at 8:30 pm EDT, Bundy chose to wait until the next morning to tell the President. McNamara was briefed at midnight. The next morning, Bundy showed Kennedy the U-2 photographs and briefed him on the CIA's analysis of the images. At 6:30 pm EDT, Kennedy convened a meeting of the nine members of the National Security Council and five other key advisers, in a group he named the Executive Committee of the National Security Council (EXCOMM) after the fact on 22 October by National Security Action Memorandum 196. Without informing the members of EXCOMM, President Kennedy tape-recorded all of their proceedings, and Sheldon M. Stern, head of the Kennedy library transcribed some of them.

On 16 October, President Kennedy notified Attorney General Robert Kennedy that he was convinced the Soviets were placing missiles on Cuba, that it was a legitimate threat and that the possibility of nuclear destruction by two world superpowers had become a reality. Robert Kennedy responded by contacting the Soviet Ambassador, Anatoly Dobrynin. Robert Kennedy expressed his "concern about what was happening" and Dobrynin "was instructed by Soviet Chairman Nikita S. Khrushchev to assure President Kennedy that there would be no ground-to-ground missiles or offensive weapons placed in Cuba". Khrushchev further assured Kennedy that the Soviet Union had no intention of "disrupting the relationship of our two countries" despite the photo evidence presented before President Kennedy.

=== Responses considered ===
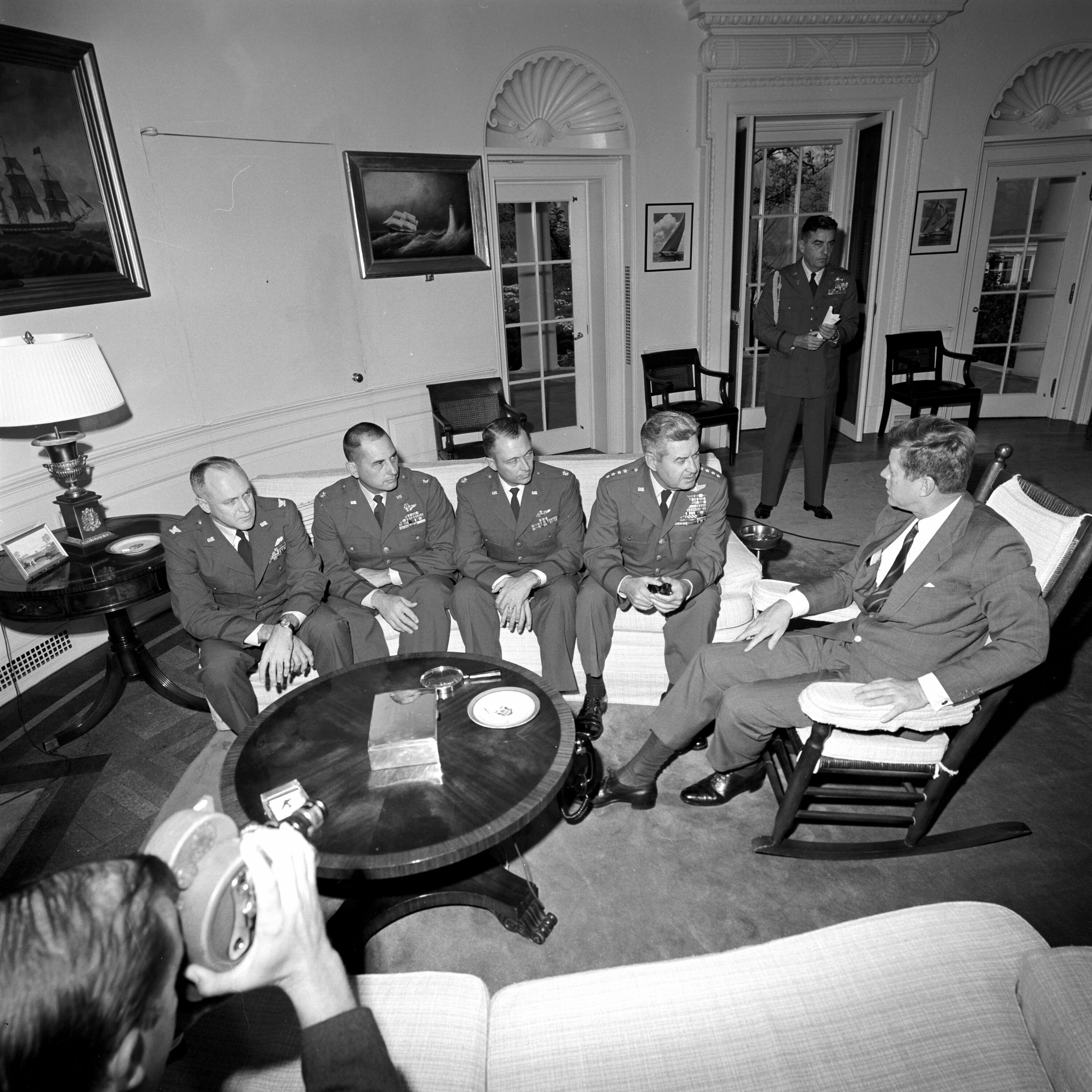
President Kennedy meets in the Oval Office with General Curtis LeMay and the reconnaissance pilots who found the missile sites in Cuba.

The US had no plan for a response in place because it had never expected that the Soviets would install nuclear missiles on Cuba. EXCOMM discussed several possible courses of action:

1. Do nothing: American vulnerability to Soviet missiles was not new.
2. Diplomacy: Use diplomatic pressure to induce the Soviet Union to remove the missiles.
3. Secret approach: Offer Castro the choice of parting from the Soviets or being invaded.
4. Invasion: Full-force invasion of Cuba and overthrow of Castro.
5. Air strike: Use the US Air Force to attack all known missile sites.
6. Blockade: Use the US Navy to block any missiles from arriving in Cuba.

Game tree models how the US and the Soviet Union would have considered their decisions

The Joint Chiefs of Staff unanimously agreed that a full-scale attack and invasion was the only solution. They believed that the Soviets would not attempt to stop the US from conquering Cuba. Kennedy was skeptical:

They, no more than we, can let these things go by without doing something. They can't, after all their statements, permit us to take out their missiles, kill a lot of Russians, and then do nothing. If they don't take action in Cuba, they certainly will in Berlin.

Kennedy concluded that attacking Cuba by air would signal the Soviets to presume "a clear line" to conquer Berlin. Kennedy also believed that US allies would think of the country as "trigger-happy cowboys" who lost Berlin because they could not peacefully resolve the Cuban situation.

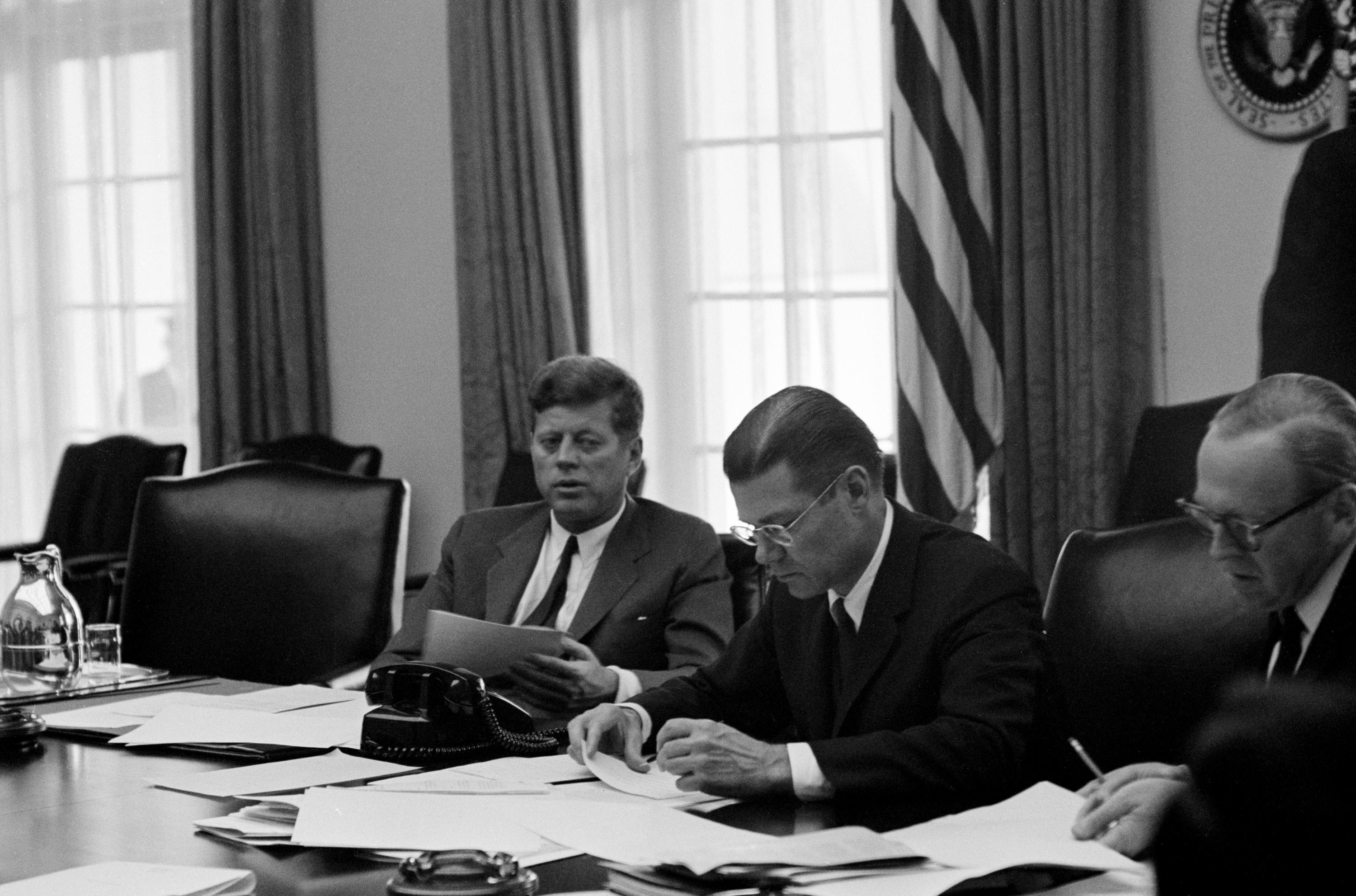
President Kennedy and Secretary of Defense McNamara in an EXCOMM meeting, 29 October 1962

EXCOMM considered the effect on the strategic balance of power, both political and military. The Joint Chiefs of Staff believed that the missiles would seriously alter the military balance, but McNamara disagreed. An extra 40, he reasoned, would make little difference to the overall strategic balance. The US already had approximately 5,000 strategic warheads, but the Soviet Union had only 300. McNamara concluded that the Soviets having 340 would not therefore substantially alter the strategic balance. In 1990, he reiterated that "it made no difference.... The military balance wasn't changed. I didn't believe it then, and I don't believe it now."

It was agreed that the missiles would affect the political balance. Kennedy had explicitly promised the American people less than a month before the crisis that "if Cuba should possess a capacity to carry out offensive actions against the United States... the United States would act." Further, US credibility among its allies and people would be damaged if the Soviet Union appeared to redress the strategic imbalance by placing missiles in Cuba. Kennedy explained after the crisis that "it would have politically changed the balance of power. It would have appeared to, and appearances contribute to reality."

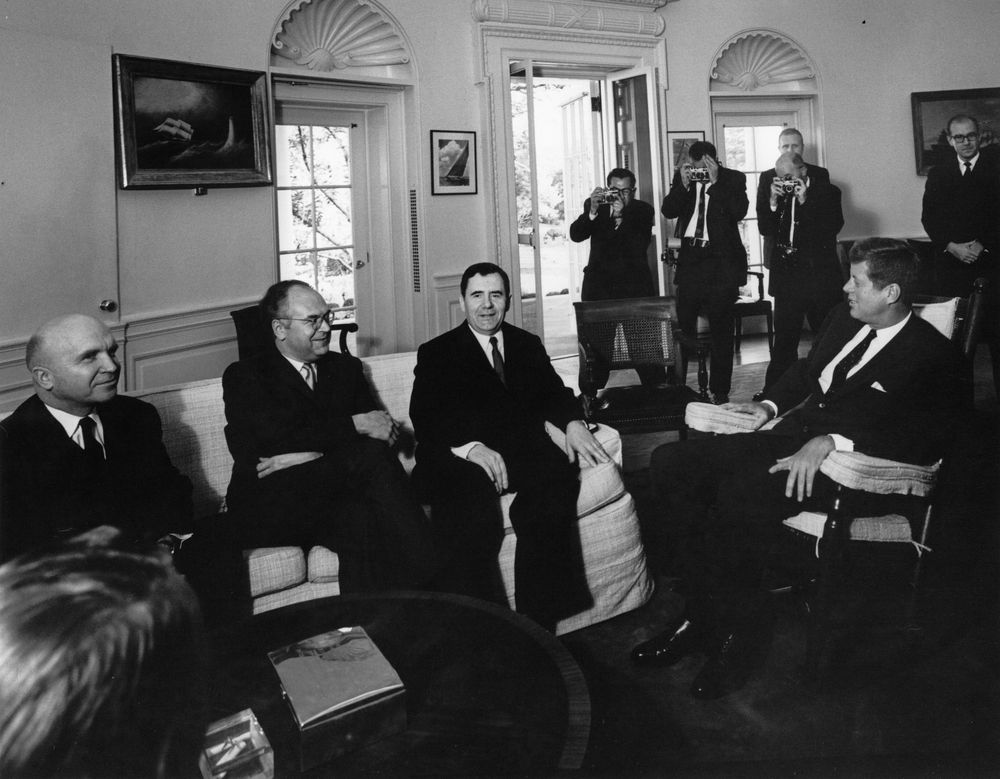
President Kennedy meets in the Oval Office with Soviet Foreign Minister Andrei Gromyko, 18 October 1962.

On 18 October 1962, Kennedy met Soviet Minister of Foreign Affairs Andrei Gromyko, who claimed that the weapons were for defensive purposes only. Not wanting to expose what he already knew and to avoid panicking the American public, Kennedy did not reveal that he was already aware of the missile buildup.

== Operational plans ==
Two Operational Plans (OPLAN) were considered. OPLAN 316 envisioned a full invasion of Cuba by Army and Marine units, supported by the Navy, following Air Force and naval airstrikes. Army units in the US would have had difficulty fielding mechanised and logistical assets, and the US Navy could not supply enough amphibious shipping to transport even a modest armoured contingent from the Army.

OPLAN 312, primarily an Air Force and Navy carrier operation, was designed with enough flexibility to do anything from engaging individual missile sites to providing air support for OPLAN 316's ground forces.

== Blockade ==
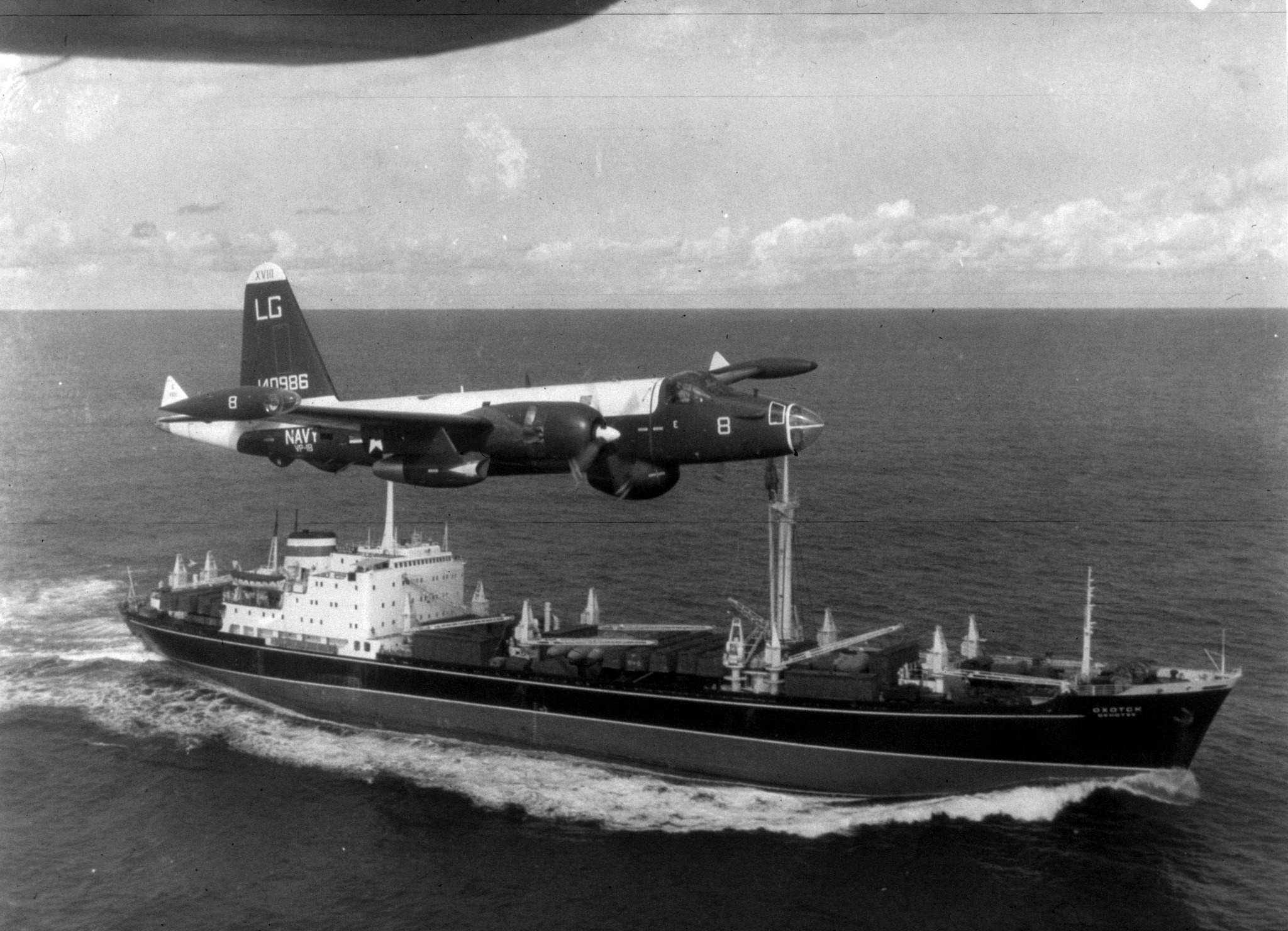
A US Navy P-2H Neptune of VP-18 flying over a Soviet cargo ship with crated Il-28s on deck during the Cuban Crisis

Kennedy conferred with members of EXCOMM and other top advisers throughout 21 October and considered the two remaining options: an air strike primarily against the Cuban missile bases or a naval blockade of Cuba. A full-scale invasion was not the administration's first option. McNamara supported the naval blockade as a strong but limited military action that would leave the US in control. The term "blockade" was problematic – according to international law, a blockade is an act of war, but the Kennedy administration did not think that the Soviets would be provoked to attack by a mere blockade. Legal experts at the State Department and Justice Department concluded that a declaration of war could be avoided if another legal justification, based on the Rio Treaty for defence of the Western Hemisphere, was obtained from a resolution by a two-thirds vote from the members of the Organization of American States (OAS).

Admiral George Anderson, Chief of Naval Operations wrote a position paper that helped Kennedy to differentiate between what they termed a "quarantine" of offensive weapons and a blockade of all materials, claiming that a classic blockade was not the original intention. Since it would take place in international waters, Kennedy obtained the approval of the OAS for military action under the hemispheric defence provisions of the Rio Treaty:

Latin American participation in the quarantine now involved two Argentine destroyers which were to report to the US Commander South Atlantic [COMSOLANT] at Trinidad on November 9. An Argentine submarine and a Marine battalion with lift were available if required. In addition, two Venezuelan destroyers (Destroyers ARV D-11 Nueva Esparta" and "ARV D-21 Zulia") and one submarine (Caribe) had reported to COMSOLANT, ready for sea by November 2. The Government of Trinidad and Tobago offered the use of Chaguaramas Naval Base to warships of any OAS nation for the duration of the "quarantine". The Dominican Republic had made available one escort ship. Colombia was reported ready to furnish units and had sent military officers to the US to discuss this assistance. The Argentine Air Force informally offered three SA-16 aircraft in addition to forces already committed to the "quarantine" operation.

This initially was to involve a naval blockade against offensive weapons within the framework of the Organization of American States and the Rio Treaty. Such a blockade might be expanded to cover all types of goods and air transport. The action was to be backed up by surveillance of Cuba. The CNO's scenario was followed closely in later implementing the "quarantine."

On 19 October, the EXCOMM formed separate working groups to examine the air strike and blockade options, and by the afternoon most support in the EXCOMM had shifted to a blockade. Reservations about the plan continued to be voiced as late as 21 October, the paramount concern being that once the blockade was put into effect, the Soviets would rush to complete some of the missiles and the US could find itself bombing operational missiles if the blockade had not already forced their removal.

=== Speech to the nation ===
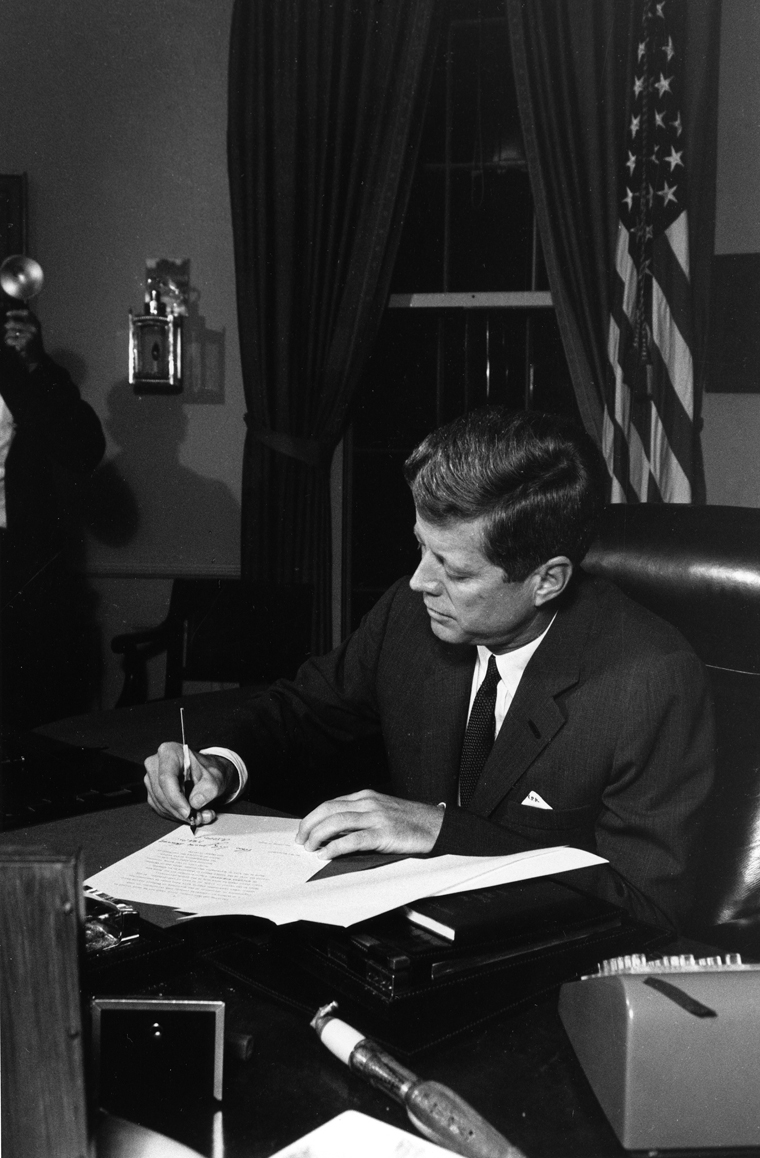
President Kennedy signing the Proclamation for Interdiction of the Delivery of Offensive Weapons to Cuba at the Oval Office on 23 October 1962.

At 3:00 pm EDT on 22 October 1962, President Kennedy formally established the executive committee (EXCOMM) with National Security Action Memorandum (NSAM) 196. At 5:00 pm, he met Congressional leaders, who opposed a blockade and demanded a stronger response. In Moscow, US Ambassador Foy D. Kohler briefed Khrushchev on the pending blockade and Kennedy's speech to the nation. Ambassadors around the world gave notice to non-Eastern Bloc leaders. Before the speech, US delegations met Canadian Prime Minister John Diefenbaker, British Prime Minister Harold Macmillan, West German Chancellor Konrad Adenauer, French President Charles de Gaulle and Secretary-General of the Organization of American States, José Antonio Mora to brief them on this intelligence and the US's proposed response. All were supportive of the US position. Over the course of the crisis, Kennedy had daily telephone conversations with Macmillan, who was publicly supportive of US actions.

Shortly before his speech, Kennedy telephoned former President Dwight Eisenhower. Kennedy's conversation with the former president also revealed that the two had been consulting during the Cuban Missile Crisis. The two also anticipated that Khrushchev would respond to the Western world in a manner similar to his response during the Suez Crisis, and would possibly wind up trading off Berlin.

Address on the Buildup of Arms in Cuba
Kennedy addressing the nation on 22 October 1962 about the buildup of arms on Cuba

At 7:00 pm EDT on 22 October, Kennedy delivered a nationwide televised address on all of the major networks announcing the discovery of the missiles. He noted:

It shall be the policy of this nation to regard any nuclear missile launched from Cuba against any nation in the Western Hemisphere as an attack by the Soviet Union on the United States, requiring a full retaliatory response upon the Soviet Union.

Kennedy described the administration's plan:

To halt this offensive buildup, a strict quarantine on all offensive military equipment under shipment to Cuba is being initiated. All ships of any kind bound for Cuba, from whatever nation or port, will, if found to contain cargoes of offensive weapons, be turned back. This quarantine will be extended, if needed, to other types of cargo and carriers. We are not at this time, however, denying the necessities of life as the Soviets attempted to do in their Berlin blockade of 1948.

During the speech, a directive went out to all US forces worldwide, placing them on DEFCON 3. The heavy cruiser USS Newport News was the designated flagship for the blockade, with USS Leary as Newport News's destroyer escort. Kennedy's speech writer Ted Sorensen stated in 2007 that the address to the nation was "Kennedy's most important speech historically, in terms of its impact on our planet."

=== Crisis deepens ===
On 23 October 1962, US Air Force RF-101A/C Voodoos and US Navy RF-8A Crusaders began flying extremely hazardous low-level photo reconnaissance missions over Cuba. Only once did the Cuban Air Force scramble a MiG-19 to attempt a shoot-down, but the attempt was unsuccessful.

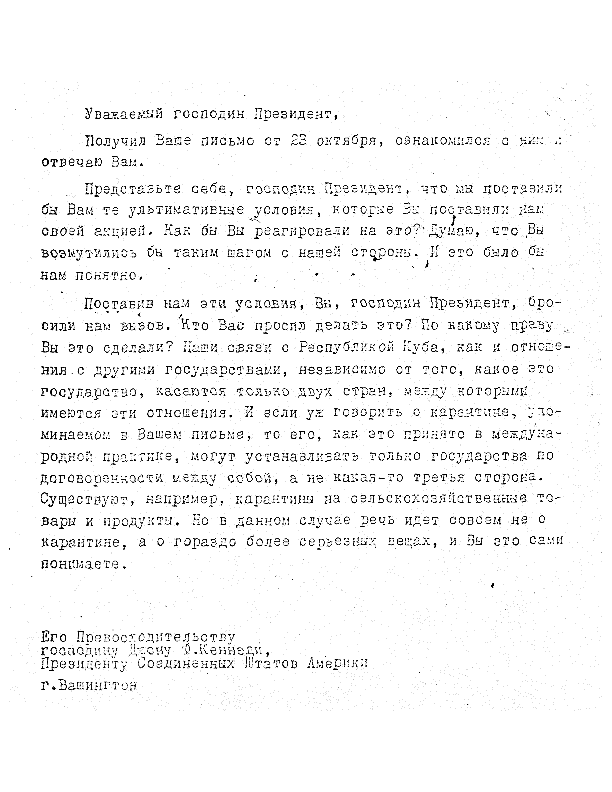
Soviet First Secretary Khrushchev's letter to Kennedy (dated 24 October 1962) stating that the blockade of Cuba "constitute[s] an act of aggression"

At 11:24 am EDT on 24 October, a cable from US Under Secretary of State George Ball to the US Ambassadors in Turkey and NATO notified them that they were considering making an offer to withdraw missiles from Italy and Turkey in exchange for Soviet withdrawal from Cuba. Turkish officials replied that they would "deeply resent" any trade involving the US missile presence in their country. One day later, on the morning of 25 October, American journalist Walter Lippmann proposed the same thing in his syndicated column. Castro reaffirmed Cuba's right to self-defense and said that all of its weapons were defensive and Cuba would not allow an inspection.

=== International response ===
In the United Kingdom, Prime Minister Harold Macmillan supported Kennedy's response. The British ambassador to the United States, David Ormsby-Gore, was a close family friend of the Kennedys and actively involved in White House discussions on how to resolve the crisis.

In West Germany, newspapers supported the US response by contrasting it with the weak American actions in the region during the preceding months. They also expressed some fear that the Soviets might retaliate in Berlin. The West German government was supportive of the blockade.

In France on 23 October, the crisis made the front page of all the daily newspapers. The next day, an editorial in Le Monde expressed doubt about the authenticity of the CIA's photographic evidence. Two days later, after a visit by a high-ranking CIA agent, the newspaper accepted the validity of the photographs. French President Charles de Gaulle gave Kennedy his full support, but he viewed the crisis as a demonstration of Europe's vulnerability to superpower conflict.

On 24 October, Pope John XXIII sent a message to the Soviet embassy in Rome, to be transmitted to the Kremlin, in which he voiced his concern for peace. In this message he stated, "We beg all governments not to remain deaf to this cry of humanity. That they do all that is in their power to save peace."

Three days after Kennedy's speech, the Chinese People's Daily announced that "650,000,000 Chinese men and women were standing by the Cuban people." The crisis coincided with the Sino-Indian War, with China launching a surprise attack on India at the Himalayan border.

The Organization of American States (OAS) backed the United States' naval quarantine, condemned the Soviet missile buildup in Cuba and voted to take measures to prevent more offensive weapons from reaching Cuba.

In the 29 October issue of Le Figaro, Raymond Aron wrote in support of the American response.

=== Soviet broadcast and communications ===
The crisis continued unabated, and on the evening of 24 October 1962, the Soviet TASS news agency broadcast a telegram from Khrushchev to Kennedy in which Khrushchev warned that the United States' "outright piracy" would lead to war. Khrushchev then sent at 9:24 pm a telegram to Kennedy, which was received at 10:52 pm EDT. Khrushchev stated, "if you weigh the present situation with a cool head without giving way to passion, you will understand that the Soviet Union cannot afford not to decline the despotic demands of the USA". The Soviet Union viewed the blockade as "an act of aggression" and their ships would be instructed to ignore it. After 23 October, Soviet communications with the US increasingly showed indications of having been rushed. Undoubtedly a result of pressure, it was not uncommon for Khrushchev to repeat himself and to send messages lacking basic editing. With President Kennedy making known his aggressive intentions of a possible airstrike followed by an invasion on Cuba, Khrushchev sought a diplomatic compromise. Communications between the two superpowers had entered a new and revolutionary period, with the threat of mutual destruction now accompanying the deployment of nuclear weapons.

=== US alert level raised ===
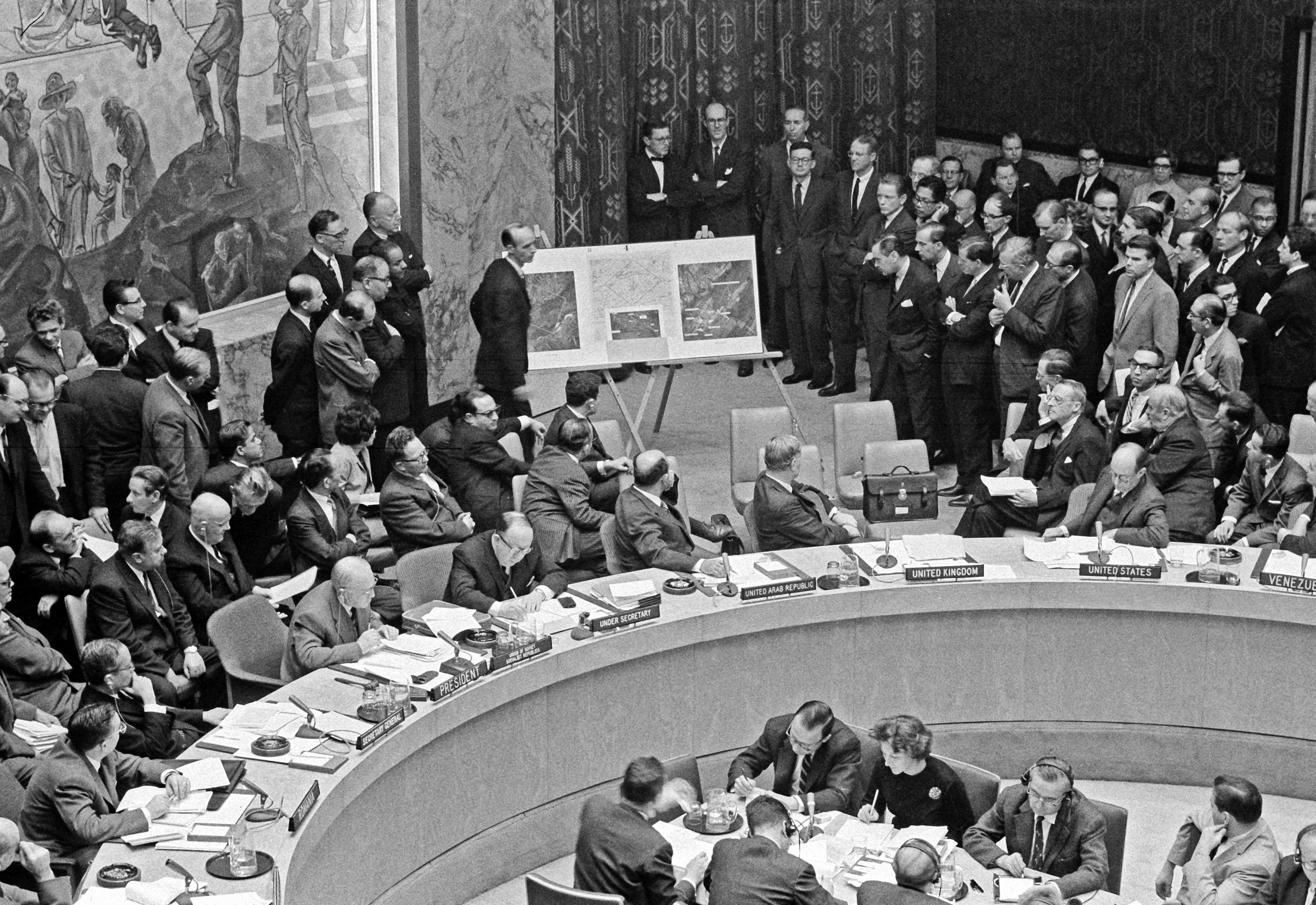
Adlai Stevenson shows aerial photos of Cuban missiles to the United Nations, 25 October 1962.

The US requested an emergency meeting of the United Nations Security Council on 25 October and Ambassador to the United Nations, Adlai Stevenson, confronted Soviet Ambassador Valerian Zorin and challenged him to admit the existence of the missiles. Ambassador Zorin refused to answer. At 10:00 pm EDT the next day, the US raised the readiness level of Strategic Air Command (SAC) forces to DEFCON 2. For the only confirmed time in US history, B-52 bombers were put on continuous airborne alert. B-47 medium bombers were dispersed to military and civilian airfields and made ready to take off, fully equipped, at 15 minutes' notice. One-eighth of SAC's 1,436 bombers were on airborne alert. Some 145 intercontinental ballistic missiles, some of which targeted Cuba, were placed on alert. Air Defense Command (ADC) redeployed 161 nuclear-armed interceptors to 16 dispersal fields within nine hours, with one third on 15-minute alert status. Twenty-three nuclear-armed B-52 bombers were sent to orbit points within striking distance of the Soviet Union to demonstrate that the US was serious. Jack J. Catton later estimated that about 80 per cent of SAC's planes were ready for launch during the crisis. David A. Burchinal recalled that, by contrast:

the Russians were so thoroughly stood down, and we knew it. They didn't make any move. They did not increase their alert; they did not increase any flights, or their air defense posture. They didn't do a thing, they froze in place. We were never further from nuclear war than at the time of Cuba, never further.

By 22 October, Tactical Air Command (TAC) had 511 fighters plus supporting tankers and reconnaissance aircraft deployed to face Cuba on one-hour alert status. TAC and the Military Air Transport Service had problems: the concentration of aircraft in Florida strained command and support echelons, which were facing critical undermanning in security, armaments, and communications. Absence of permission to use war-reserve stocks of conventional munitions forced TAC to scrounge supplies, and the lack of airlift assets to support a major airborne drop necessitated the call-up of 24 reserve squadrons.

On 25 October at 1:45 am EDT, Kennedy responded to Khrushchev's telegram by stating that the US was forced into action after receiving repeated false assurances that no offensive missiles were being placed in Cuba. Deployment of the missiles "required the responses I have announced.... I hope that your government will take necessary action to permit a restoration of the earlier situation."

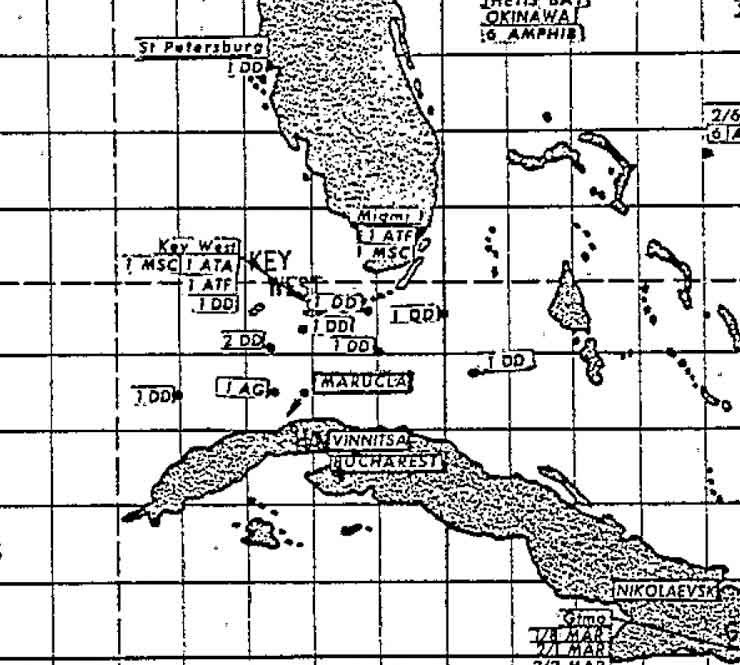
A declassified map used by the US Navy's Atlantic Fleet showing the position of American and Soviet ships at the height of the crisis

=== Blockade challenged ===
At 7:15 am EDT on 25 October, USS Essex and USS Gearing attempted to intercept Bucharest but failed to do so. Fairly certain that the tanker did not contain any military material, the US allowed it through the blockade. Later that day, at 5:43 pm, the commander of the blockade ordered the destroyer USS Joseph P. Kennedy Jr. to intercept and board the Lebanese freighter Marucla. That took place the next day, and Marucla was cleared through the blockade after its cargo was checked.

At 5:00 pm EDT on 25 October, William Clements announced that the missiles in Cuba were still being worked on. This was later verified by a CIA report that suggested there had been no slowdown. In response, Kennedy issued Security Action Memorandum 199, authorizing the loading of nuclear weapons onto aircraft under the command of SACEUR, which had the duty of carrying out first air strikes on the Soviet Union. Kennedy claimed that the blockade had succeeded when the USSR turned back fourteen ships presumed to be carrying offensive weapons. The first indication of this was in a report from British GCHQ sent to the White House Situation Room which contained intercepted communications from Soviet ships reporting their positions. On 24 October, Kislovodsk, a Soviet cargo ship, reported a position north-east of where it had been 24 hours earlier, indicating it had "discontinued" its voyage and turned back towards the Baltic. The next day, further reports showed that more ships originally bound for Cuba had altered their course.

=== Raising the stakes ===
The next morning, 26 October, Kennedy informed EXCOMM that he believed only an invasion would remove the missiles from Cuba. He was persuaded to wait and continue with military and diplomatic pressure. He agreed and ordered low-level flights over the island to be increased from two per day to every two hours. He also ordered a crash program to institute a new civil government in Cuba if an invasion went ahead.

At this point the crisis appeared to be at a stalemate. The Soviets had shown no indication that they would back down and had made public media and private inter-government statements to that effect. The US had no reason to disbelieve them and was in the early stages of preparing an invasion of Cuba and a nuclear strike on the Soviet Union if it responded militarily, which the US assumed it would. Kennedy had no intention of keeping these plans secret, and with an array of Cuban and Soviet spies present Khrushchev was made aware of them.

The implicit threat of air strikes on Cuba followed by an invasion allowed the United States to exert pressure in future talks, and the prospect of military action helped to accelerate Khrushchev's proposal for a compromise. Throughout the closing stages of October 1962, Soviet communications to the United States became increasingly defensive, and Khrushchev's tendency to use poorly phrased and ambiguous language during negotiations increased the United States' confidence and clarity in messaging. Leading Soviet figures failed to mention that only the Cuban government could agree to inspections of the territory, and continued to make arrangements relating to Cuba without Castro's knowledge. According to Dean Rusk, Khrushchev "blinked": he began to panic from the consequences of his own plan, and this was reflected in the tone of Soviet messages. This allowed the US to dominate negotiations in late October.

The escalating situation also caused Khrushchev to abandon plans for a possible Warsaw Pact invasion of Albania, which was being discussed in the Eastern Bloc following the Vlora incident the previous year.

== Secret negotiations ==
At 1:00 pm EDT on 26 October, John A. Scali of ABC News met Aleksandr Fomin, the cover name of Alexander Feklisov, the KGB station chief in Washington, at Fomin's request. Following the instructions of the Politburo of the CPSU, Fomin noted, "War seems about to break out." He asked Scali to use his contacts to talk to his "high-level friends" at the State Department to see if the US would be interested in a diplomatic solution. He suggested that the language of the deal would contain an assurance from the Soviet Union to remove the weapons under UN supervision and that Castro would publicly announce that he would not accept such weapons again, in exchange for a public statement by the US that it would not invade Cuba. The US responded by asking the Brazilian government to pass a message to Castro that the US would be "unlikely to invade" if the missiles were removed.

Mr. President, we and you ought not now to pull on the ends of the rope in which you have tied the knot of war, because the more the two of us pull, the tighter that knot will be tied. And a moment may come when that knot will be tied so tight that even he who tied it will not have the strength to untie it, and then it will be necessary to cut that knot, and what that would mean is not for me to explain to you, because you yourself understand perfectly of what terrible forces our countries dispose.

Consequently, if there is no intention to tighten that knot and thereby to doom the world to the catastrophe of thermonuclear war, then let us not only relax the forces pulling on the ends of the rope, let us take measures to untie that knot. We are ready for this.

— Letter From Chairman Khrushchev to President Kennedy, 26 October 1962

At 6:00 pm EDT on 26 October, the State Department started receiving a message that appeared to be written personally by Khrushchev. It was Saturday 2:00 am in Moscow. The long letter took several minutes to arrive, and it took translators additional time to translate and transcribe it.

Robert F. Kennedy described the letter as "very long and emotional". Khrushchev reiterated the basic outline that had been stated to Scali earlier in the day: "I propose: we, for our part, will declare that our ships bound for Cuba are not carrying any armaments. You will declare that the United States will not invade Cuba with its troops and will not support any other forces which might intend to invade Cuba. Then the necessity of the presence of our military specialists in Cuba will disappear." At 6:45 pm EDT, news of Fomin's offer to Scali was finally heard and was interpreted as a "set up" for the arrival of Khrushchev's letter. The letter was then considered official and accurate, although it was later learned that Fomin was almost certainly operating without official backing. Additional study of the letter was ordered and continued into the night.

=== Crisis continues ===
Direct aggression against Cuba would mean nuclear war. The Americans speak about such aggression as if they did not know or did not want to accept this fact. I have no doubt they would lose such a war.

— Che Guevara, October 1962

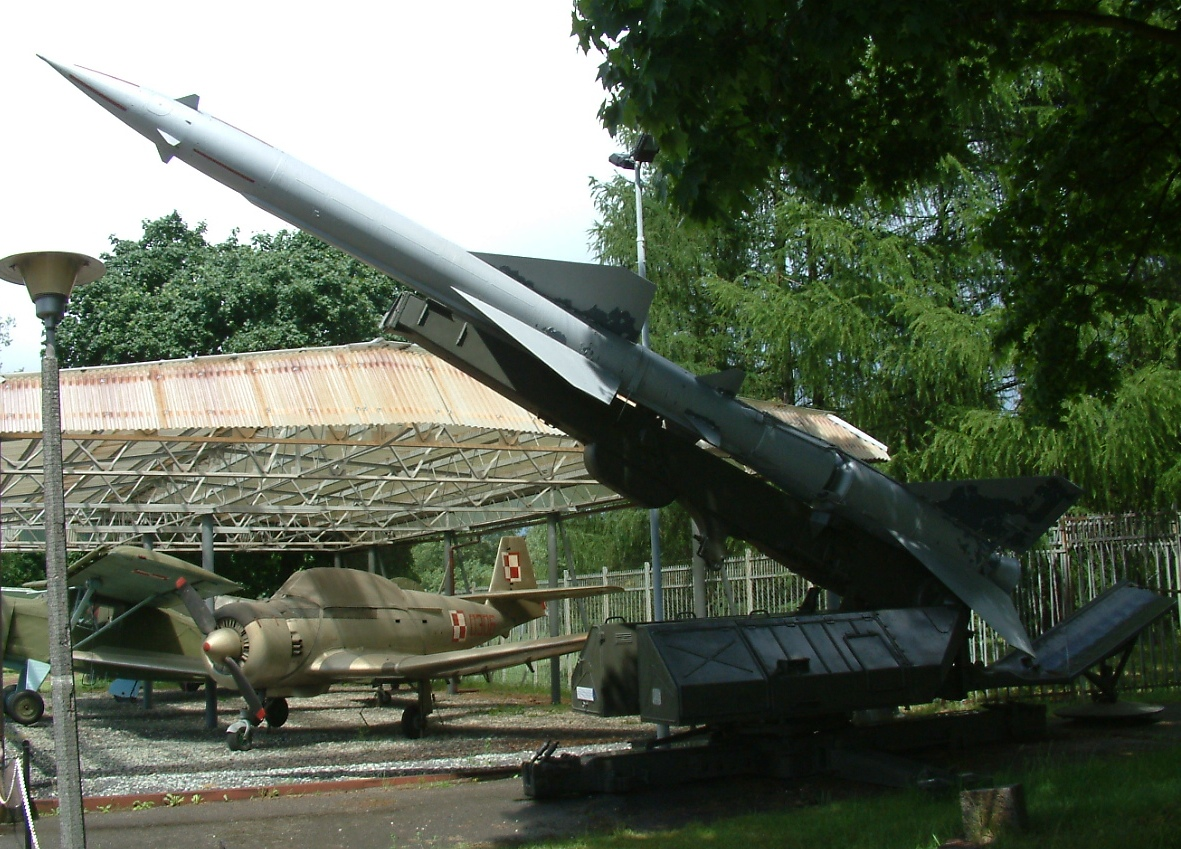
S-75 Dvina with V-750V 1D missile (NATO designation SA-2 Guideline) on a launcher. A similar installation shot down Major Anderson's U-2 over Cuba.

Castro, on the other hand, was convinced that an invasion of Cuba was imminent, and on 26 October he sent a telegram to Khrushchev that appeared to call for a pre-emptive nuclear strike on the US in case of attack. In a 2010 interview, Castro expressed regret about his 1962 stance on first use: "After I've seen what I've seen, and knowing what I know now, it wasn't worth it at all." Castro also ordered all anti-aircraft weapons in Cuba to fire on any US aircraft. Previous orders had been to fire only on groups of two or more. At 6:00 am EDT on 27 October, the CIA delivered a memo reporting that three of the four missile sites at San Cristobal and both sites at Sagua la Grande appeared to be fully operational. It also noted that the Cuban military continued to organise for action but was under order not to act unless attacked.

At 9:00 am EDT on 27 October, Radio Moscow began broadcasting a message from Khrushchev. Contrary to the letter of the night before, the message offered a new trade: the missiles on Cuba would be removed in exchange for the removal of the Jupiter missiles from Italy and Turkey. At 10:00 am EDT, the executive committee met again to discuss the situation and came to the conclusion that the change in the message was because of internal debate between Khrushchev and other party officials in the Kremlin. Kennedy realised that he would be in an "insupportable position if this becomes Khrushchev's proposal" because the missiles in Turkey were not militarily useful and were being removed anyway, and "It's gonna – to any man at the United Nations or any other rational man, it will look like a very fair trade." Bundy explained why Khrushchev's public acquiescence could not be considered: "The current threat to peace is not in Turkey, it is in Cuba."

McNamara noted that another tanker, the Grozny, was about 600 miles (970 km) out and should be intercepted. He also noted that they had not made the Soviets aware of the blockade line and suggested relaying that information to them via U Thant at the United Nations.

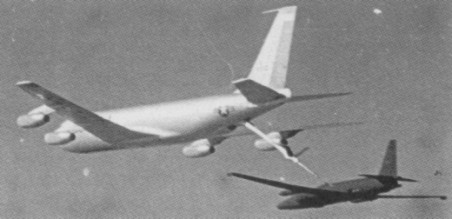
A Lockheed U-2F, the high altitude reconnaissance type shot down over Cuba, being refueled by a Boeing KC-135Q. The aircraft in 1962 was painted overall gray and carried USAF military markings and national insignia.

While the meeting progressed, at 11:03 am EDT a new message began to arrive from Khrushchev. The message stated, in part:

You are disturbed over Cuba. You say that this disturbs you because it is ninety-nine miles by sea from the coast of the United States of America. But... you have placed destructive missile weapons, which you call offensive, in Italy and Turkey, literally next to us.... I therefore make this proposal: We are willing to remove from Cuba the means which you regard as offensive.... Your representatives will make a declaration to the effect that the United States... will remove its analogous means from Turkey... and after that, persons entrusted by the United Nations Security Council could inspect on the spot the fulfillment of the pledges made.

The executive committee continued to meet through the day.

Throughout the crisis, Turkey had repeatedly stated that it would be upset if the Jupiter missiles were removed. Italy's Prime Minister Amintore Fanfani, who was also Foreign Minister ad interim, offered to allow withdrawal of the missiles deployed in Apulia as a bargaining chip. He gave the message to one of his most trusted friends, Ettore Bernabei, general manager of RAI-TV, to convey to Arthur M. Schlesinger Jr. Bernabei was in New York to attend an international conference on satellite TV broadcasting.

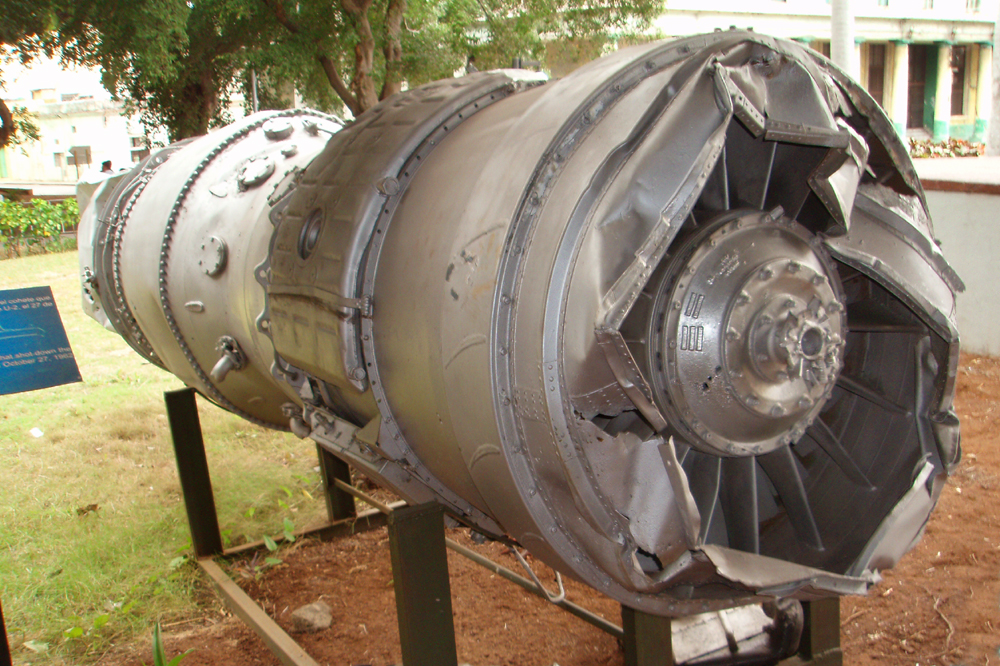
The engine of the Lockheed U-2 shot down over Cuba on display at Museum of the Revolution in Havana

On Saturday, October 27, USAF Major Rudolf Anderson took off on his sixth mission over Cuba in a U-2F Dragon Lady (AF Serial Number 56-6676, former CIA Article 343 - the third CIA U-2A, modified for air-to-air refuelling), from a forward operating location at McCoy Air Force Base in Orlando, Florida. A few hours into his mission, at approximately 12:00 pm EDT, he was shot down over Banes, Cuba, by one of two Soviet-supplied S-75 Dvina (NATO designation SA-2 Guideline) surface-to-air missiles that were fired at his aircraft per the order of two Soviet generals (Soviet Forces Deputy Commander Major General Leonid Garbuz & Deputy Commander of Air Defenses Lieutenant General Stepan Grechko), both of whom were stationed in a command center in Havana. Before giving this order, they attempted to obtain authorization from their superior officer Army General Issa Pliyev (Commander of all Soviet forces in Cuba during Operation Anadyr), but after finding that Pliyev was unreachable (possibly due to illness) they decided to authorize the shoot-down themselves. The aircraft crashed, and Anderson was killed. Later that day, at about 3:41 pm EDT, several US Navy RF-8A Crusader aircraft, on low-level photo-reconnaissance missions, were fired upon.

At 4:00 pm EDT, Kennedy recalled members of EXCOMM to the White House and ordered that a message should immediately be sent to U Thant asking the Soviets to suspend work on the missiles while negotiations were carried out. During the meeting, General Maxwell Taylor delivered the news that the U-2 had been shot down. Kennedy had earlier claimed he would order an attack on such sites if fired upon, but he decided to not act unless another attack was made. On 28 October 1962, Khrushchev told his son Sergei that the shooting down of Anderson's U-2 was by the "Cuban military at the direction of Raúl Castro".

On 27 October Bobby Kennedy relayed a message to the Soviet Ambassador that President Kennedy was under pressure from the military to use force against Cuba and that "an irreversible chain of events could occur against his will" as "the president is not sure that the military will not overthrow him and seize power". He therefore implored Khrushchev to accept Kennedy's proposed agreement.

Forty years later, McNamara said:

We had to send a U-2 over to gain reconnaissance information on whether the Soviet missiles were becoming operational. We believed that if the U-2 was shot down that—the Cubans didn't have capabilities to shoot it down, the Soviets did—we believed if it was shot down, it would be shot down by a Soviet surface-to-air-missile unit, and that it would represent a decision by the Soviets to escalate the conflict. And therefore, before we sent the U-2 out, we agreed that if it was shot down we wouldn't meet, we'd simply attack. It was shot down on Friday.... Fortunately, we changed our mind, we thought "Well, it might have been an accident, we won't attack." Later we learned that Khrushchev had reasoned just as we did: we send over the U-2, if it was shot down, he reasoned we would believe it was an intentional escalation. And therefore, he issued orders to Pliyev, the Soviet commander in Cuba, to instruct all of his batteries not to shoot down the U-2. (Note: McNamara mistakenly dates the shooting down of USAF Major Rudolf Anderson's U-2 on October 26.)

Daniel Ellsberg said that Robert Kennedy (RFK) told him in 1964 that after the U-2 was shot down and the pilot killed, he (RFK) told Soviet ambassador Dobrynin, "You have drawn first blood ... . [T]he president had decided against advice ... not to respond militarily to that attack, but he [Dobrynin] should know that if another plane was shot at, ... we would take out all the SAMs and anti-aircraft ... . And that would almost surely be followed by an invasion."

=== Drafting response ===
Emissaries sent by both Kennedy and Khrushchev agreed to meet at the Yenching Palace Chinese restaurant in the Cleveland Park neighbourhood of Washington, DC, on Saturday evening, 27 October. Kennedy suggested taking Khrushchev's offer to trade away the missiles. Unknown to most members of the EXCOMM, but with the support of his brother the president, Robert Kennedy had been meeting the Soviet Ambassador Dobrynin in Washington to discover whether the intentions were genuine. The EXCOMM was against the proposal because it would undermine NATO's authority, and the Turkish government had repeatedly stated that it was against any such trade.

As the meeting progressed, a new plan emerged, and Kennedy was slowly persuaded. The new plan called for him to ignore the latest message and instead to return to Khrushchev's earlier one. Kennedy was initially hesitant, feeling that Khrushchev would no longer accept the deal because a new one had been offered, but Llewellyn Thompson argued that it was still possible. White House Special Counsel and Adviser Ted Sorensen and Robert Kennedy left the meeting and returned 45 minutes later, with a draft letter to that effect. The President made several changes, had it typed, and sent it.

After the EXCOMM meeting, a smaller meeting continued in the Oval Office. The group argued that the letter should be underscored with an oral message to Dobrynin that stated that if the missiles were not withdrawn, military action would be used to remove them. Rusk added one proviso that no part of the language of the deal would mention Turkey, but there would be an understanding that the missiles would be removed "voluntarily" in the immediate aftermath. The president agreed, and the message was sent.

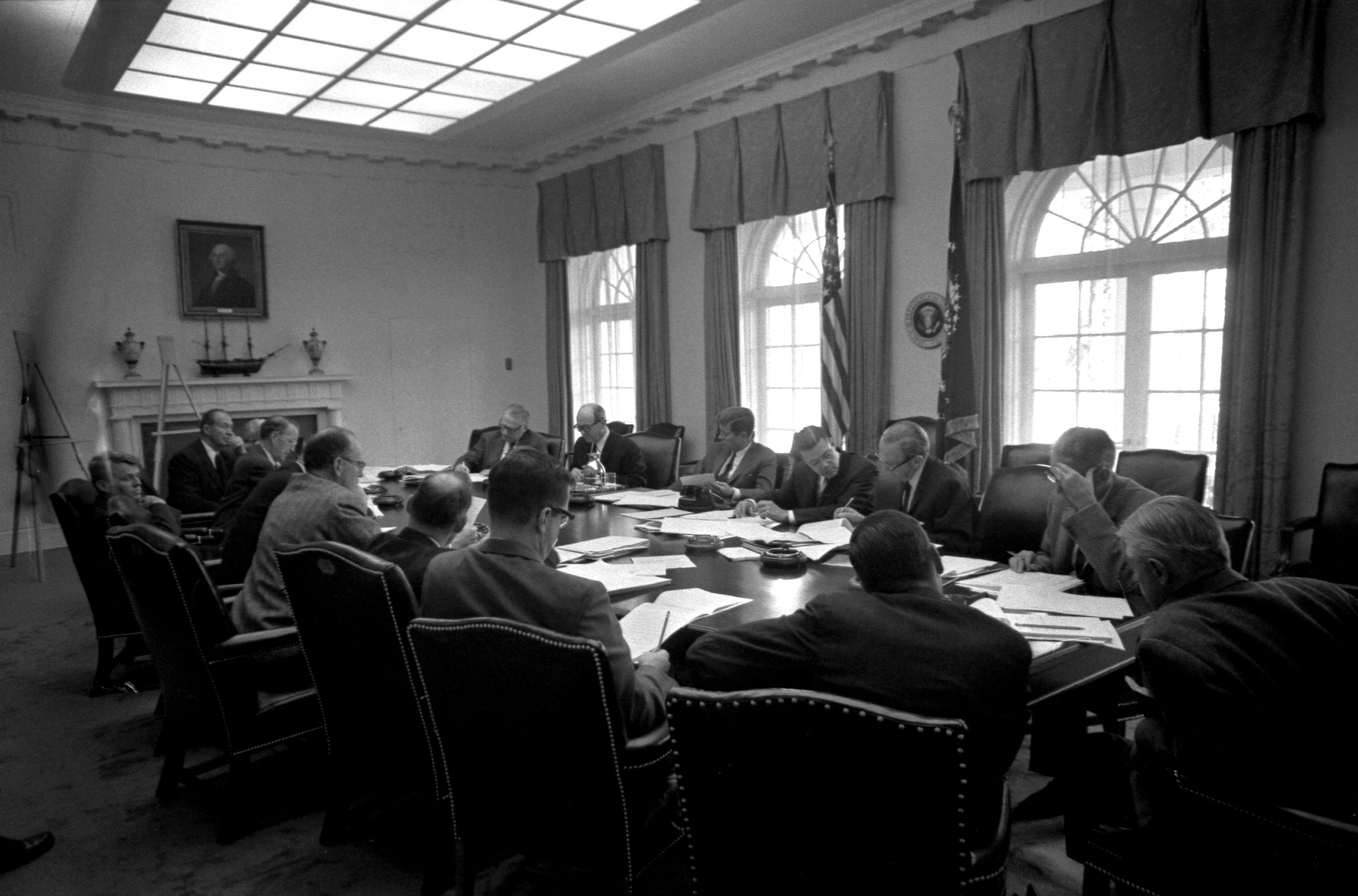
EXCOMM meeting in the White House Cabinet Room, with President Kennedy, Robert McNamara and Dean Rusk in attendance, 29 October 1962

At Rusk's request, Fomin and Scali met again. Scali asked why the two letters from Khrushchev were so different, and Fomin claimed it was because of "poor communications". Scali replied that the claim was not credible and shouted that he thought it was a "stinking double cross". He went on to claim that an invasion was only hours away, and Fomin stated that a response to the US message was expected from Khrushchev shortly and urged Scali to tell the State Department that no treachery was intended. Scali said that he did not think anyone would believe him, but he agreed to deliver the message. The two went their separate ways, and Scali immediately typed out a memo for the EXCOMM.

Within the US establishment, it was understood that ignoring the second offer and returning to the first put Khrushchev in a terrible position. Military preparations continued, and all active duty Air Force personnel were recalled to their bases for possible action. Robert Kennedy later recalled the mood: "We had not abandoned all hope, but what hope there was now rested with Khrushchev's revising his course within the next few hours. It was a hope, not an expectation. The expectation was military confrontation by Tuesday [30 October], and possibly tomorrow [29 October] ...."

At 8:05 pm EDT, the letter drafted earlier in the day was delivered. The message read, "As I read your letter, the key elements of your proposals—which seem generally acceptable as I understand them—are as follows: 1) You would agree to remove these weapons systems from Cuba under appropriate United Nations observation and supervision; and undertake, with suitable safe-guards, to halt the further introduction of such weapon systems into Cuba. 2) We, on our part, would agree—upon the establishment of adequate arrangements through the United Nations, to ensure the carrying out and continuation of these commitments (a) to remove promptly the quarantine measures now in effect and (b) to give assurances against the invasion of Cuba." The letter was also released directly to the press to ensure it could not be "delayed". With the letter delivered, a deal was on the table. As Robert Kennedy noted, there was little expectation it would be accepted. At 9:00 pm EDT, the EXCOMM met again to review the actions for the following day. Plans were drawn up for air strikes on the missile sites as well as other economic targets, notably petroleum storage. McNamara stated that they had to "have two things ready: a government for Cuba, because we're going to need one; and secondly, plans for how to respond to the Soviet Union in Europe, because sure as hell they're going to do something there".

At 12:12 am EDT, on 27 October, the US informed its NATO allies that "the situation is growing shorter.... the United States may find it necessary within a very short time in its interest and that of its fellow nations in the Western Hemisphere to take whatever military action may be necessary." To add to the concern, at 6:00 am, the CIA reported that all missiles in Cuba were ready for action.

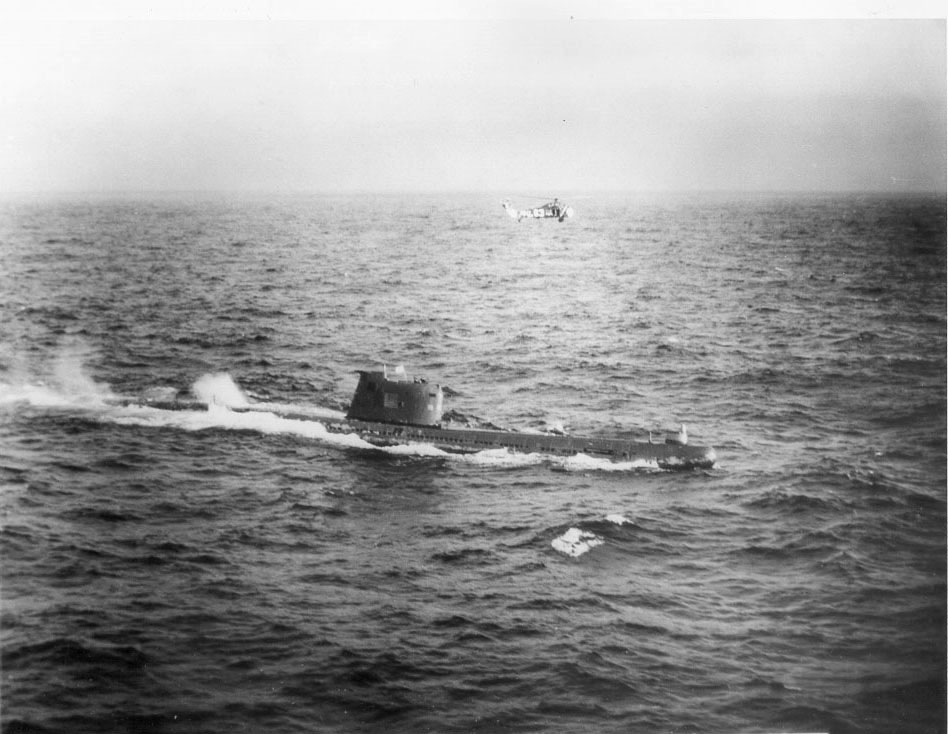
A US Navy HSS-1 Seabat helicopter hovers over Soviet submarine B-59, driven to the surface by US Naval forces in the Caribbean near Cuba (28 or 29 October 1962).

On 27 October, Khrushchev also received a letter from Castro, what is now known as the Armageddon Letter (dated the day before), which urged the use of nuclear force in the event of an attack on Cuba: "I believe the imperialists' aggressiveness is extremely dangerous and if they actually carry out the brutal act of invading Cuba in violation of international law and morality, that would be the moment to eliminate such danger forever through an act of clear legitimate defense, however harsh and terrible the solution would be," Castro wrote.

=== Averted nuclear launch ===
Later that same day, what the White House later called "Black Saturday", the US Navy dropped a series of "signalling" depth charges ("practice" depth charges the size of hand grenades) on a Soviet submarine (B-59) at the blockade line, unaware that it was armed with a nuclear-tipped torpedo that could be launched if the submarine was damaged by depth charges or surface fire. The submarine was too deep to monitor radio traffic and the captain of the B-59, Valentin Grigoryevich Savitsky, assuming after live ammunition fire at his submarine that a war had started, proposed to launch the nuclear torpedo at the US ships. The decision to launch the "special weapon" normally only required the agreement of the ship's commanding officer and political officer, but the commander of the submarine flotilla, Vasily Arkhipov, was aboard B-59 and he also had to agree. Arkhipov did not give his consent and the nuclear torpedo was not launched. (These events only became publicly known in 2002. See Submarine close call.)

On the same day, a U-2 spy plane made an accidental and unauthorised 90-minute overflight of the Soviet Union's far eastern coast. The Soviets responded by scrambling MiG fighters from Wrangel Island; in turn, the Americans launched F-102 fighters armed with nuclear air-to-air missiles over the Bering Sea.

== Resolution ==
On Saturday, 27 October, after much deliberation between the Soviet Union and Kennedy's cabinet, Kennedy secretly agreed to remove all missiles in Turkey, on the border of the Soviet Union, and possibly those in southern Italy, in exchange for Khrushchev removing all missiles in Cuba. There is some dispute as to whether removing the missiles from Italy was part of the secret agreement. Khrushchev wrote in his memoirs that it was, and when the crisis had ended McNamara gave the order to dismantle the missiles in both Italy and Turkey.

At this point, Khrushchev knew things the US did not. First, that the shooting down of the U-2 by a Soviet missile violated direct orders from Moscow, and Cuban anti-aircraft fire against other US reconnaissance aircraft also violated direct orders from Khrushchev to Castro. Second, the Soviets already had 162 nuclear warheads on Cuba that the US did not know were there. Third, the Soviets and Cubans on the island would almost certainly have responded to an invasion by using them, even though Castro believed that everyone in Cuba would die as a result. Khrushchev also knew, but may not have considered, that he had submarines nearby armed with nuclear weapons of which the US Navy may not have been aware.

Khrushchev knew he was losing control. President Kennedy had been told in early 1961 that a nuclear war would probably kill a third of humanity, with most or all of those deaths concentrated in the US, the USSR, Europe and China, and Khrushchev may have received a similar estimate.

With this background, when Khrushchev heard of Kennedy's threats as relayed by Robert Kennedy to Soviet Ambassador Dobrynin, he immediately drafted his acceptance of Kennedy's latest terms from his dacha without involving the Politburo, as he had previously, and had them immediately broadcast over Radio Moscow, which he believed the US would hear. In that broadcast at 9:00 am EST, on 28 October 1962, Khrushchev stated that "the Soviet government, in addition to previously issued instructions on the cessation of further work at the building sites for the weapons, has issued a new order on the dismantling of the weapons which you describe as 'offensive' and their crating and return to the Soviet Union." At 10:00 am on 28 October, Kennedy first learned of Khrushchev's solution to the crisis: the US would remove the 15 Jupiters in Turkey and the Soviets would remove the missiles from Cuba. Khrushchev had made the offer in a public statement for the world to hear. Despite almost solid opposition from his senior advisers, Kennedy accepted the Soviet offer. "This is a pretty good play of his," Kennedy said, according to a tape recording that he made secretly of the Cabinet Room meeting. Kennedy had deployed the Jupiters in March 1962, causing a stream of angry outbursts from Khrushchev. "Most people will think this is a rather even trade and we ought to take advantage of it," Kennedy said. Vice President Lyndon Johnson was the first to endorse the missile swap, but others continued to oppose it. Finally, Kennedy ended the debate. "We can't very well invade Cuba with all its toil and blood," Kennedy said, "when we could have gotten them out by making a deal on the same missiles on Turkey. If that's part of the record, then you don't have a very good war."

Kennedy immediately responded to Khrushchev's letter, issuing a statement calling it "an important and constructive contribution to peace". He continued this with a formal letter:

I consider my letter to you of October twenty-seventh and your reply of today as firm undertakings on the part of both our governments which should be promptly carried out.... The US will make a statement in the framework of the Security Council in reference to Cuba as follows: it will declare that the United States of America will respect the inviolability of Cuban borders, its sovereignty, that it take the pledge not to interfere in internal affairs, not to intrude themselves and not to permit our territory to be used as a bridgehead for the invasion of Cuba, and will restrain those who would plan to carry an aggression against Cuba, either from US territory or from the territory of other countries neighboring to Cuba.

Kennedy's planned statement would also contain suggestions he had received from his adviser Arthur Schlesinger Jr. in a "Memorandum for the President" describing the "Post Mortem on Cuba".

On 28 October, Kennedy participated in telephone conversations with Eisenhower and fellow former US President Harry Truman. In these calls, Kennedy revealed that he thought the crisis would result in the two superpowers being "toe to toe" in Berlin by the end of the following month and expressed concern that the Soviet setback in Cuba would "make things tougher" there. He also informed his predecessors that he had rejected the public Soviet offer to withdraw from Cuba in exchange for the withdrawal of US missiles from Turkey.

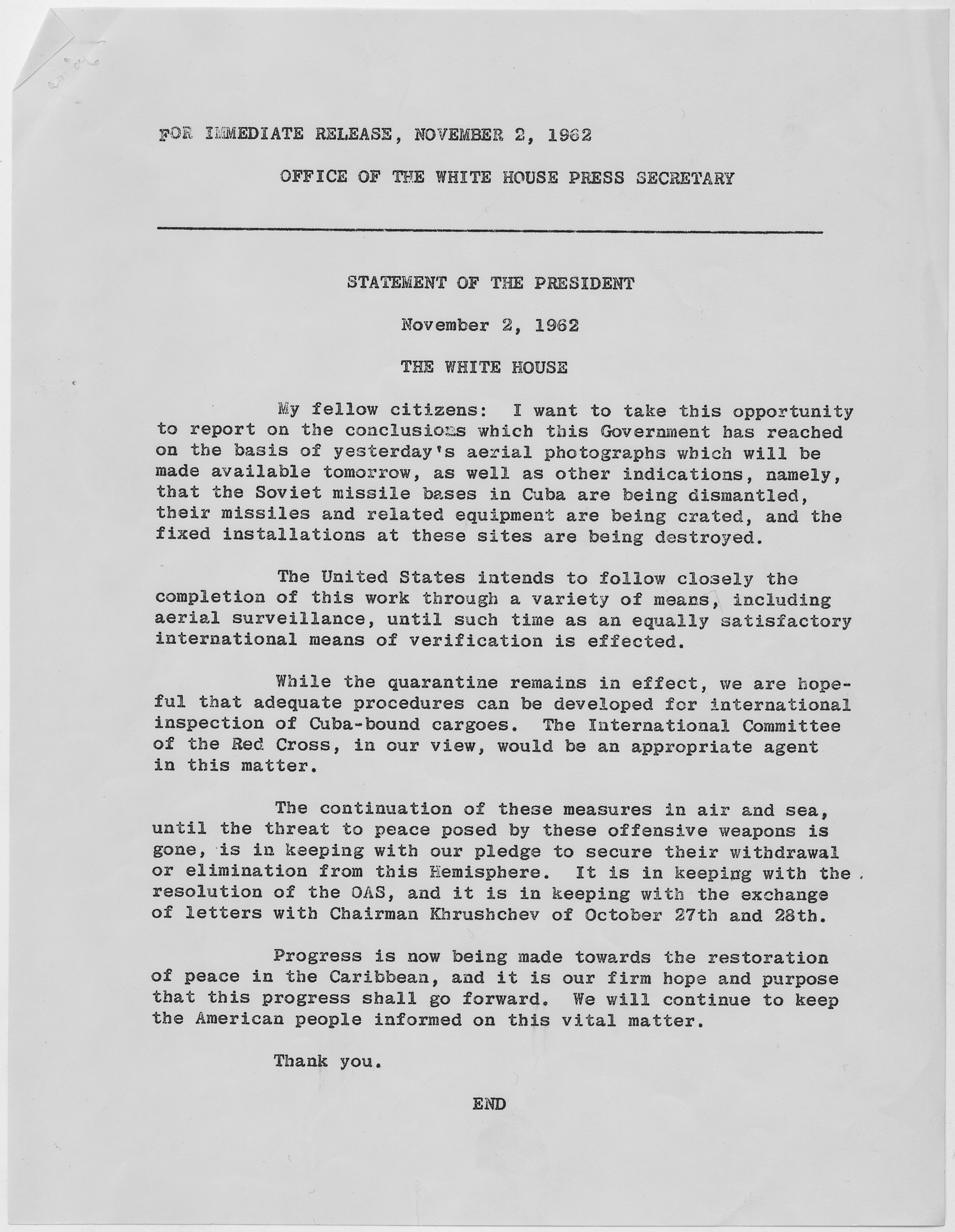
Removal of Missiles in Cuba 11 November 1962 – NARA – 193868

The US continued the blockade of Cuba. In the following days aerial reconnaissance showed that the Soviets were making progress in removing the missile systems. The 42 missiles and their support equipment were loaded onto eight Soviet ships. On 2 November 1962, Kennedy addressed the US via radio and television broadcasts concerning the dismantling of the Soviet R-12 missile bases located in the Caribbean. The ships left Cuba on November 5 to 9. The US made a final visual check as each of the ships passed the blockade line. Further diplomatic efforts were required to remove the Soviet Il-28 bombers, and they were loaded on three Soviet ships on 5 and 6 December. Concurrent with the Soviet commitment on the Il-28s, the US government announced the end of the blockade from 6:45 pm EST on 20 November 1962.

At the time when the Kennedy administration believed that the Cuban Missile Crisis was resolved, nuclear tactical rockets remained in Cuba which were not part of the Kennedy-Khrushchev understanding and the Americans did not know about them. The Soviets changed their minds, fearing possible future Cuban militant steps, and on 22 November 1962, Deputy Premier of the Soviet Union Anastas Mikoyan told Castro that the rockets with the nuclear warheads were being removed as well.

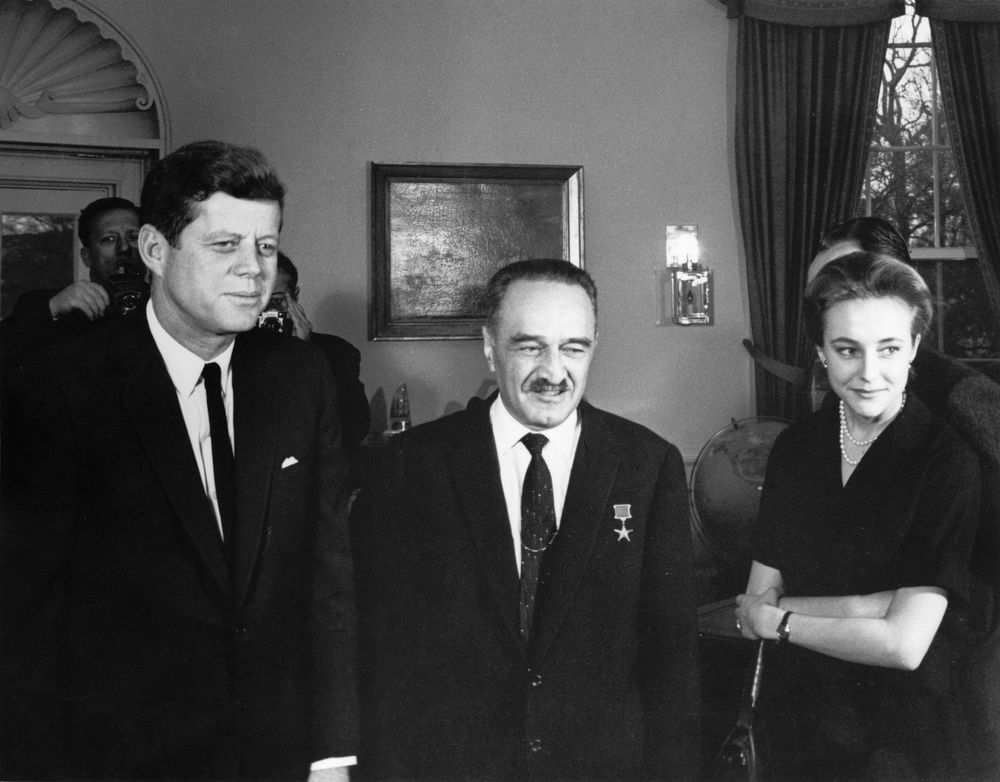
Mikoyan with John F. Kennedy and State Department interpreter Natalie Kushnir at the Oval Office, November 28, 1962

The Cuban Missile Crisis was solved in part by a secret agreement between John F. Kennedy and Nikita Khrushchev. The Kennedy-Khrushchev Pact was known to only nine US officials at the time of its creation in October 1962 and was first officially acknowledged at a conference in Moscow in January 1989 by Soviet Ambassador Anatoly Dobrynin and Kennedy's speechwriter Theodore Sorensen. In his negotiations with Dobrynin, Robert Kennedy informally proposed that the Jupiter missiles in Turkey would be removed "within a short time after this crisis was over". Under an operation code-named Operation Pot Pie, the removal of the Jupiters from Italy and Turkey began on 1 April, and was completed by 24 April 1963. The initial plans were to recycle the missiles for use in other programs, but NASA and the USAF were not interested in retaining the missile hardware. The missile bodies were destroyed on site, while warheads, guidance packages, and launching equipment worth $14 million were returned to the United States. The dismantling operations were named Pot Pie I for Italy and Pot Pie II for Turkey by the United States Air Force.

The outcome of the Kennedy-Khrushchev Pact was that the US would remove their rockets from Italy and Turkey and that the Soviets had no intention of resorting to nuclear war if they were out-gunned by the US. Because the withdrawal of the Jupiter missiles from NATO bases in Italy and Turkey was not made public at the time, Khrushchev appeared to have lost the conflict and become weakened. The perception was that Kennedy had won the contest between the superpowers and that Khrushchev had been humiliated. Both Kennedy and Khrushchev took every step to avoid full conflict despite pressures from their respective governments. Khrushchev held power for another two years. As a direct result of the crisis, the United States and the Soviet Union set up a direct line of communication. The hotline between the Soviet Union and the United States was a way for the President and the Premier to have negotiations should a crisis like this ever happen again.

== Nuclear forces ==
By the time of the crisis in October 1962, the total number of nuclear weapons in the stockpiles of each country numbered approximately 26,400 for the United States and 3,300 for the Soviet Union. For the US, around 3,500 (with a combined yield of approximately 6,300 megatons) would have been used in attacking the Soviet Union. The Soviets had considerably less strategic firepower at their disposal: some 300–320 bombs and warheads, without submarine-based weapons in a position to threaten the US mainland and most of their intercontinental delivery systems based on bombers that would have difficulty penetrating North American air defence systems. They had already moved 158 warheads to Cuba and between 95 and 100 would have been ready for use if the US had invaded Cuba, most of them short-range. The US had approximately 4,375 nuclear weapons deployed in Europe, most of which were tactical weapons such as nuclear artillery, with around 450 of them for ballistic missiles, cruise missiles, and aircraft; the Soviets had more than 550 similar weapons in Europe.

=== United States ===
- SAC
  - ICBM: 182 (at peak alert); 121 Atlas D/E/F, 53 Titan 1, 8 Minuteman 1A
  - Bombers: 1,595; 880 B-47, 639 B-52, 76 B-58 (1,479 bombers and 1,003 refuelling tankers available at peak alert)
- Atlantic Command
  - 112 UGM-27 Polaris in seven SSBNs (16 each); five submarines with Polaris A1 and two with A2
- Pacific Command
  - 4–8 Regulus cruise missiles
  - 16 Mace cruise missiles
  - Three aircraft carriers with some 40 bombs each
  - Land-based aircraft with some 50 bombs
- European Command
  - IRBM: 45 Jupiter (30 Italy, 15 Turkey)
  - 48–90 Mace cruise missiles
  - Two US Sixth Fleet aircraft carriers with some 40 bombs each
  - Land-based aircraft with some 50 bombs

=== Soviet Union ===
- Strategic (for use against North America):
  - ICBM: 42; four SS-6/R-7A at Plesetsk with two in reserve at Baikonur, 36 SS-7/R-16 with 26 in silos and ten on open launch pads
  - Bombers: 160 (readiness unknown); 100 Tu-95 Bear, 60 3M Bison B
- Regional (mostly targeting Europe, and others targeting US bases in east Asia):
  - MRBM: 528 SS-4/R-12, 492 at soft launch sites and 36 at hard launch sites (approximately six to eight R-12s were operational in Cuba, capable of striking the US mainland at any moment until the crisis was resolved)
  - IRBM: 28 SS-5/R-14
  - Unknown number of Tu-16 Badger, Tu-22 Blinder, and MiG-21 aircraft tasked with nuclear strike missions

=== United Kingdom ===
- Bomber Command
  - Bombers: 120; Vulcan B.1/B.1A/B.2, Victor B.1/B.1A/B2, Valiant B.1
  - IRBM: 59 Thor (missiles operated by the RAF with warheads under US supervision)

== Aftermath ==
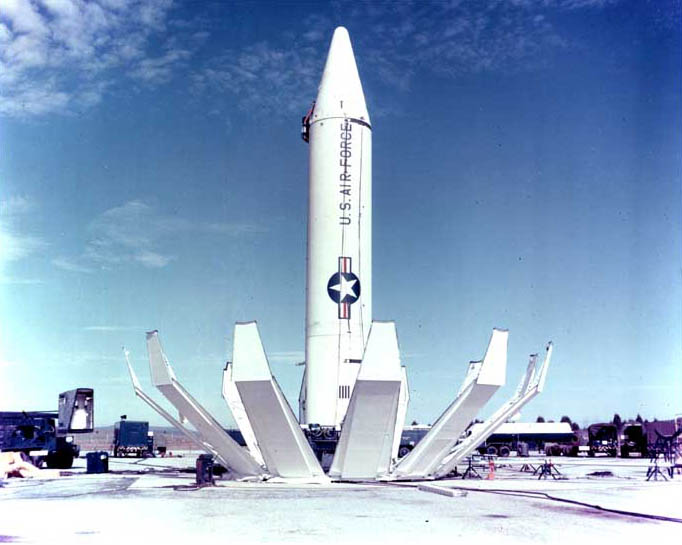
The nuclear-armed Jupiter intermediate-range ballistic missile. The US secretly agreed to withdraw the missiles from Italy and Turkey.

=== Cuban leadership ===
Decisions on how to resolve the crisis had been made exclusively by Kennedy and Khrushchev and Cuba perceived the outcome as a betrayal by the Soviets. Castro was especially upset that certain questions of interest to Cuba, such as the status of the US Naval Base in Guantánamo, were not addressed, and Cuban–Soviet relations deteriorated.

Historian Arthur Schlesinger believed that when the missiles were withdrawn, Castro was more angry with Khrushchev than with Kennedy because Khrushchev had not consulted him before making the decision. (Note: In his biography, Castro did not compare his feelings for either leader at that moment but makes it clear that he was angry with Khrushchev for failing to consult with him. (Ramonet 1978)) Although Castro was infuriated by Khrushchev, he had still planned to strike the US with the remaining missiles if Cuba was invaded.

A few weeks after the crisis, during an interview with British communist newspaper the Daily Worker, Guevara was still fuming over the perceived Soviet betrayal and told correspondent Sam Russell that if the missiles had been under Cuban control, they would have been launched. Guevara said later that the cause of socialist liberation from global "imperialist aggression" would have been worth the possibility of "millions of atomic war victims". The missile crisis further convinced Guevara that the world's two superpowers, the United States and the Soviet Union, were using Cuba as a pawn in their global strategies, and after this he denounced the Soviets almost as frequently as he denounced the Americans.

=== Romanian leadership ===
During the crisis, Gheorghe Gheorghiu-Dej, general secretary of Romania's communist party, sent a letter to President Kennedy dissociating Romania from Soviet actions. This convinced the American administration of Bucharest's intentions of detaching itself from Moscow.

=== Soviet leadership ===
The realisation that the world had come close to thermonuclear war caused Khrushchev to propose a far-reaching easing of tensions with the US. In a letter to President Kennedy dated 30 October 1962, Khrushchev suggested initiatives that were intended to prevent the possibility of another nuclear crisis. These included a non-aggression treaty between the North Atlantic Treaty Organization (NATO) and the Warsaw Pact, or even disbanding these military blocs; a treaty to cease all nuclear weapons testing and possibly eliminate all nuclear weapons; resolution of the difficult question of Germany by both sides accepting the existence of West Germany and East Germany; and US recognition of the government of mainland China. The letter invited counter-proposals and further exploration of these and other questions through peaceful negotiations. Khrushchev invited Norman Cousins, the editor of a major US periodical and an anti-nuclear weapons activist, to serve as liaison with Kennedy. Cousins met with Khrushchev for four hours in December 1962.

Kennedy's response to Khrushchev's proposals was lukewarm, but he told Cousins that he felt obliged to consider them because he was under pressure from hardliners in the US national security apparatus. The United States and the Soviet Union subsequently agreed to a treaty banning atmospheric testing of nuclear weapons, known as the "Partial Nuclear Test Ban Treaty". The US and the USSR also created a communications link, the Moscow–Washington hotline, to enable the leaders of the two Cold War countries to speak directly to each other in any future crisis.

These compromises embarrassed Khrushchev and the Soviet Union because the withdrawal of US missiles from Italy and Turkey had remained a secret deal between Kennedy and Khrushchev. Khrushchev went to Kennedy because he thought that the crisis was getting out of hand, but the Soviets were seen to be retreating from circumstances that they had started.

Khrushchev's fall from power two years later was partly because of the Soviet Politburo's embarrassment at his eventual concessions to the US and his ineptitude in precipitating the crisis in the first place. According to Dobrynin, the top Soviet leadership took the Cuban outcome as "a blow to its prestige bordering on humiliation".

=== US leadership ===
The worldwide DEFCON 3 status of US Forces was returned to DEFCON 4 on 20 November 1962. General Curtis LeMay told Kennedy that the resolution of the crisis was the "greatest defeat in our history". LeMay had pressed for an immediate invasion of Cuba as soon as the crisis began, and he still favored invading Cuba even after the Soviets had withdrawn their missiles. Twenty-five years later, LeMay still believed that "We could have gotten not only the missiles out of Cuba, we could have gotten the Communists out of Cuba at that time."

By 1962, President Kennedy had faced four crisis situations: the failure of the Bay of Pigs Invasion; settlement negotiations between the pro-Western government of Laos and the Pathet Lao communist movement ("Kennedy sidestepped Laos, whose rugged terrain was no battleground for American soldiers."); the construction of the Berlin Wall; and the Cuban Missile Crisis. Kennedy believed that another failure to gain control and stop communist expansion would irreparably damage US credibility. He was determined to "draw a line in the sand" and prevent a communist victory in Vietnam. He told James Reston of The New York Times immediately after his Vienna summit meeting with Khrushchev, "Now we have a problem making our power credible and Vietnam looks like the place."

At least four contingency strikes were armed and launched from Florida against Cuban airfields and suspected missile sites in 1963 and 1964, although all were diverted to the Pinecastle Range Complex after the planes had passed Andros island. Critics, including Seymour Melman and Seymour Hersh, suggested that the Cuban Missile Crisis had encouraged the United States to use military means, as in the later Vietnam War. Similarly, Lorraine Bayard de Volo suggested that the masculine brinksmanship of the Cuban Missile Crisis had become a "touchstone of toughness by which presidents are measured". Actions in 1962 had a significant influence on the policy decisions of future occupants of the White House, and led to foreign policy decisions such as President Lyndon B. Johnson's escalation of the war in Vietnam three years later.

=== Chinese leadership ===
The peaceful settlement between the Soviet Union and the United States over the missile crisis infuriated Beijing. Maoist China subsequently condemned Khrushchev's cowardly "capitulationism" to the Americans and Moscow's "sellout of the Cuban people." Khrushchev in response, blasted the Chinese for aggression in the Sino-Indian dispute and China's opportunist stand during the Cuban Missile Crisis.

=== The Holy See ===
In April 1963, Pope John XXIII published Pacem in terris as a response to the crisis, being the first encyclical addressed to "all men of good will", rather than only to Catholics. It discussed the rights and obligations of people and their states, and endorsed nuclear nonproliferation. According to the periodical The Catholic World Report, "Two years later, it was the subject of a conference at the United Nations attended by over 2,000 statespersons and scholars."

=== Human casualties ===
The body of U-2 pilot Anderson was returned to the US and was buried with full military honours in South Carolina. He was the first recipient of the newly created Air Force Cross, which was awarded posthumously. Although Anderson was the only combatant fatality during the crisis, 11 crew members of three reconnaissance Boeing RB-47 Stratojets of the 55th Strategic Reconnaissance Wing were also killed in crashes during the period between 27 September and 11 November 1962. Seven crew died when a Military Air Transport Service Boeing C-135B Stratolifter delivering ammunition to Guantanamo Bay Naval Base stalled and crashed on landing approach on 23 October.

== Later revelations ==
=== Submarine close call ===
What may have been the most dangerous moment in the crisis was not recognized until the Cuban Missile Crisis Havana conference in October 2002, which marked its 40th anniversary. The three-day conference was sponsored by the private National Security Archive, Brown University and the Cuban government and attended by many of the veterans of the crisis. They learned that on 27 October 1962, a group of eleven United States Navy destroyers and the aircraft carrier USS Randolph had located a diesel-powered, nuclear-armed Soviet Project 641 (NATO designation Foxtrot) submarine, the B-59, near Cuba. Despite being in international waters, the Americans started dropping practice depth charges to attempt to force the submarine to surface.

There had been no contact from Moscow for a number of days and the submarine was running too deep to monitor radio traffic, so those on board did not know whether war had broken out. The captain of the submarine, Valentin Savitsky, had no way of knowing that the depth charges were non-lethal "practice" rounds, intended as warning shots to force him to surface. Running out of air, the Soviet submarine was surrounded by American warships and desperately needed to surface. While surfacing, the B-59 "came under machine-gun fire from [U.S. ASW S-2] Tracker aircraft. (Note: This account of an USN S-2 firing on the Soviet B-59 submarine is highly doubtful. Grumman S-2s in US Navy service were not armed with integral machine guns, and there is no evidence that they were ever armed with podded machine guns on the underwing hard points. Either the aircraft type was misidentified or else the shooting never happened. That is not to say that the Soviet crew completely made up this story, it is possible they imagined a shooting due to the psychological pressure they were under, and that possibility certainly is a pertinent part of the event.) The fire rounds landed either to the sides of the submarine's hull or near the bow. All these provocative actions carried out by surface ships in immediate proximity, and ASW aircraft flying some 10 to 15 meters above the boat had a detrimental impact on the commander, prompting him to take extreme measures… the use of special weapons." As firing live ammunition at a submarine was strictly prohibited, Captain Savitsky assumed that his submarine was doomed and that World War III had started. The Americans, for their part, did not know that the B-59 was armed with a 15-kiloton nuclear torpedo, of roughly the power of the bomb at Hiroshima. The USS Beale was joined by other US destroyers who pummelled the submerged B-59 with more explosives.

Savitsky ordered the nuclear torpedo to be prepared for firing; its target was to be the USS Randolph, the aircraft carrier leading the task force. An argument broke out in the sweltering control room of the B-59 submarine among three senior officers, B-59 captain Savitsky, political officer Ivan Semyonovich Maslennikov, and Deputy brigade commander Captain 2nd rank (US Navy Commander rank equivalent) Vasily Arkhipov. Accounts differ about whether Arkhipov convinced Savitsky not to make the attack or whether Savitsky himself finally concluded that the only reasonable choice left open to him was to come to the surface. The decision to launch the nuclear torpedo required the consent of all three senior officers, and of the three, Arkhipov alone refused to give his consent. Arkhipov's reputation was a key factor in the control room debate. The previous year he had exposed himself to severe radiation in order to save a submarine with an overheating nuclear reactor.

During the conference October 2002, McNamara stated that nuclear war had come much closer than people had thought. Thomas Blanton, director of the National Security Archive, said, "A guy called Vasily Arkhipov saved the world."

=== Possibility of nuclear launch ===
In early 1992 it was confirmed that Soviet forces in Cuba had already received tactical nuclear warheads for their artillery rockets and Il-28 bombers when the crisis broke. Castro stated that he would have recommended their use if the US had invaded, even if Cuba was destroyed.

Fifty years after the crisis, Graham Allison wrote:

Fifty years ago, the Cuban Missile Crisis brought the world to the brink of nuclear disaster. During the standoff, US President John F. Kennedy thought the chance of escalation to war was "between 1 in 3 and even", and what we have learned in later decades has done nothing to lengthen those odds. We now know, for example, that in addition to nuclear-armed ballistic missiles, the Soviet Union had deployed 100 tactical nuclear weapons to Cuba, and the local Soviet commander there could have launched these weapons without additional codes or commands from Moscow. The US air strike and invasion that were scheduled for the third week of the confrontation would likely have triggered a nuclear response against American ships and troops, and perhaps even Miami. The resulting war might have led to the deaths of over 100 million Americans and over 100 million Russians.

BBC journalist Joe Matthews published the story, on 13 October 2012, after news of the 100 tactical nuclear warheads mentioned by Graham Allison in the excerpt above. Khrushchev feared that Castro's hurt pride and widespread Cuban indignation over the concessions he had made to Kennedy might lead to a breakdown of the agreement between the Soviet Union and the United States. To prevent this, Khrushchev decided to offer to give Cuba more than 100 tactical nuclear weapons that had been shipped there with the long-range missiles but, crucially, had escaped the notice of US intelligence. Khrushchev determined that because the Americans had not listed the missiles on their list of demands, keeping them in Cuba would be in the Soviet Union's interests.

Anastas Mikoyan had the task of negotiating with Castro over the missile transfer deal to prevent a breakdown in relations between Cuba and the Soviet Union. While in Havana, Mikoyan witnessed the mood swings and paranoia of Castro, who was convinced that Moscow had made the agreement with the US at the expense of Cuba's defence. Mikoyan, on his own initiative, decided that Castro and his military should not under any circumstances be given control of weapons with an explosive force equal to 100 Hiroshima-sized bombs. He defused the seemingly intractable situation, which risked re-escalating the crisis, on 22 November 1962. During a tense, four-hour meeting, Mikoyan convinced Castro that despite Moscow's desire to help, it would be in breach of an unpublished Soviet law, which did not actually exist, to transfer the missiles permanently into Cuban hands and provide them with an independent nuclear deterrent. Castro was forced to give way and, much to the relief of Khrushchev and the rest of the Soviet government, the tactical nuclear weapons were crated and returned by sea to the Soviet Union during December 1962.

== In popular culture ==
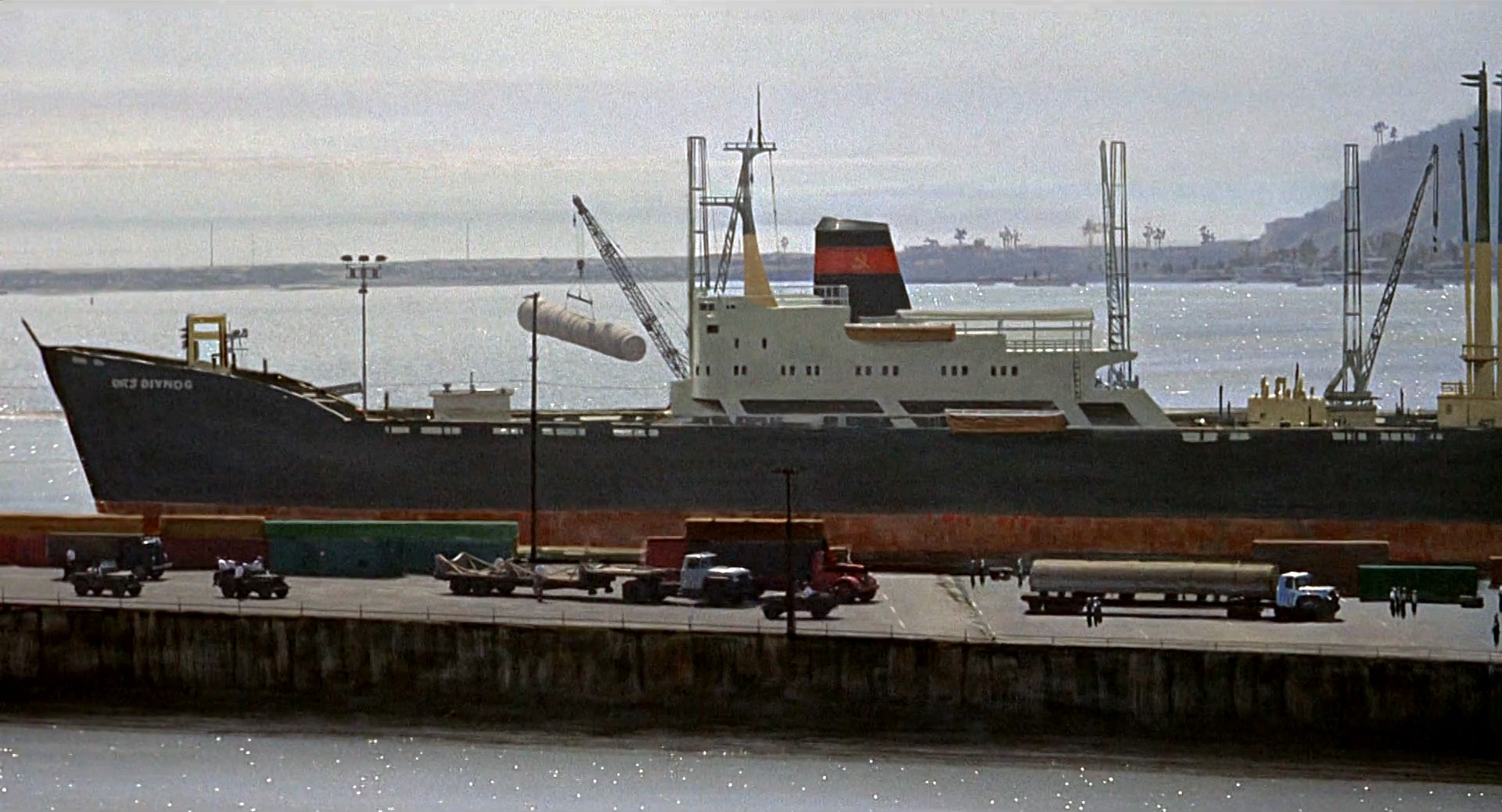
A Soviet ship unloading a missile in the 1969 spy movie Topaz

The American popular media, especially television, made frequent use of the events of the missile crisis in both fictional and documentary forms. Jim Willis includes the Crisis as one of the 100 "media moments that changed America". Sheldon Stern found that a half century later there were still many "misconceptions, half-truths, and outright lies" that had shaped media versions of what happened in the White House during those two weeks.

Historian William Cohn argued in a 1976 article that television programs were typically the main source used by the American public to know about and interpret the past. According to Cold War historian Andrei Kozovoi, the Soviet media proved somewhat disorganized as it was unable to generate a coherent popular history. Khrushchev lost power and was airbrushed out of the story and Cuba was no longer portrayed as a heroic David against the American Goliath. One contradiction that pervaded the Soviet media campaign was between the pacifistic rhetoric of the peace movement that emphasized the horrors of nuclear war and the militancy of the need to prepare Soviets for war against American aggression.

== See also ==
- Bomber gap
- Cuban thaw
- Leninsky Komsomol class cargo ships
- Norwegian rocket incident
- Nuclear disarmament
- Operation Fishbowl - two US missile-launched exoatmospheric nuclear tests conducted during the Crisis
- Peaceful coexistence
- Planned Soviet nuclear strike on China in 1969
- Soviet Navy
- Soviet Project K nuclear tests - two missile-launched exoatmospheric tests conducted during the Crisis
