= McDaniel Park =

Coordinates: 34.84444°N 82.39294°W

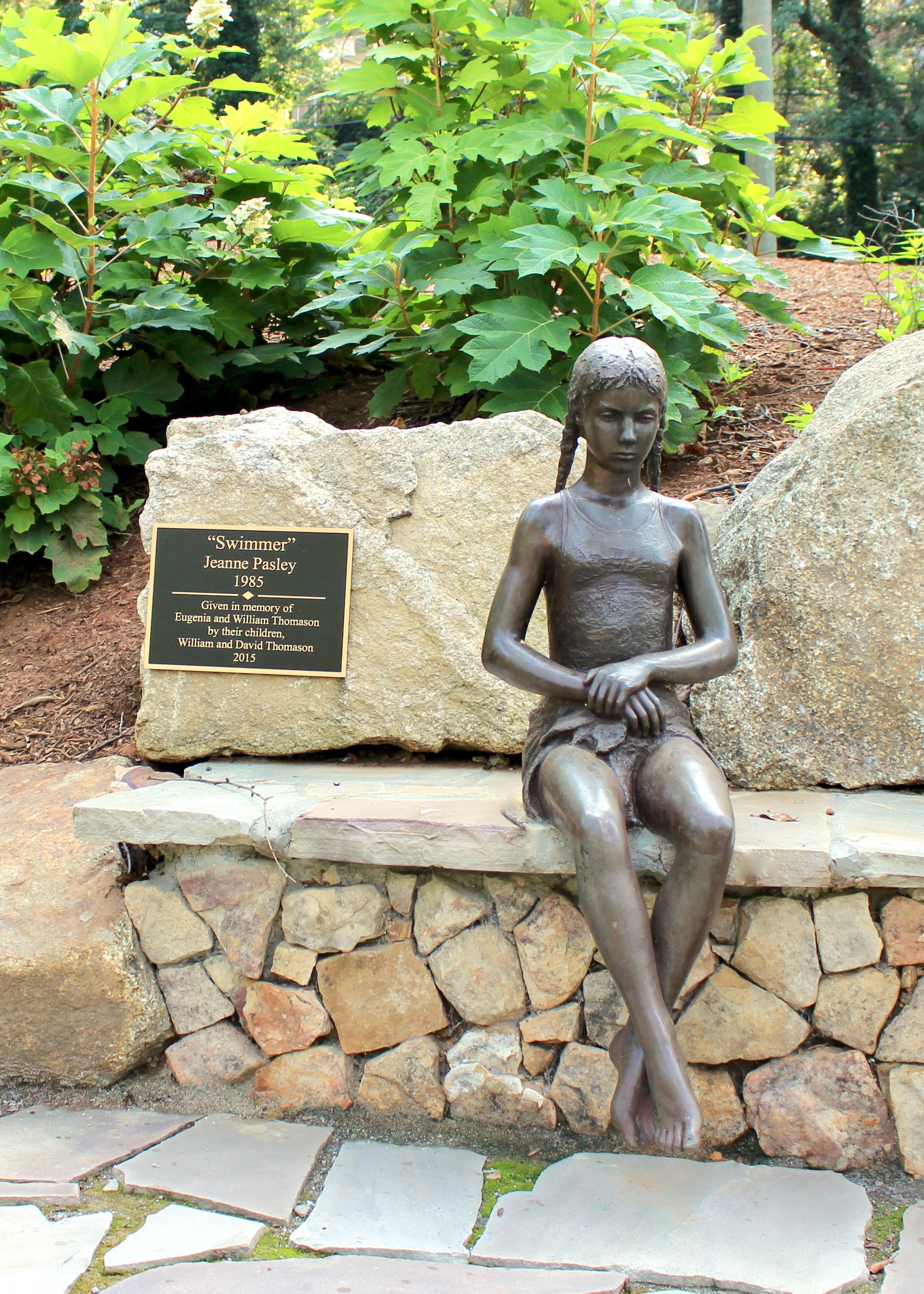
Swimmer (1985)

McDaniel Park is a pocket park in Greenville, South Carolina, near the intersection of McDaniel Avenue and McDaniel Green, adjacent to the Rock Quarry Garden, Cleveland Park. McDaniel Park was dedicated to the Dorothy Haynsworth Garden Club in October 2015; and it features a statue, "Swimmer" (1985), by Jeanne Pasley (Messer) (1918-2013), in memory of Eugenia (Woo) and William Thomason, who died in 2013 of accidental carbon monoxide poisoning.
