= Major Anderson =

Major Anderson may refer to:

- Robert Anderson (Union officer) (June 14, 1805 – October 26, 1871), an American Military leader and the commander of Fort Sumter during the Battle of Fort Sumter
- Rudolf Anderson (15 September 1927 – 27 October 1962), a pilot and officer in the United States Air Force
- A minor character from the Ender's Game novel series
