= 4080th Strategic Reconnaissance Wing =

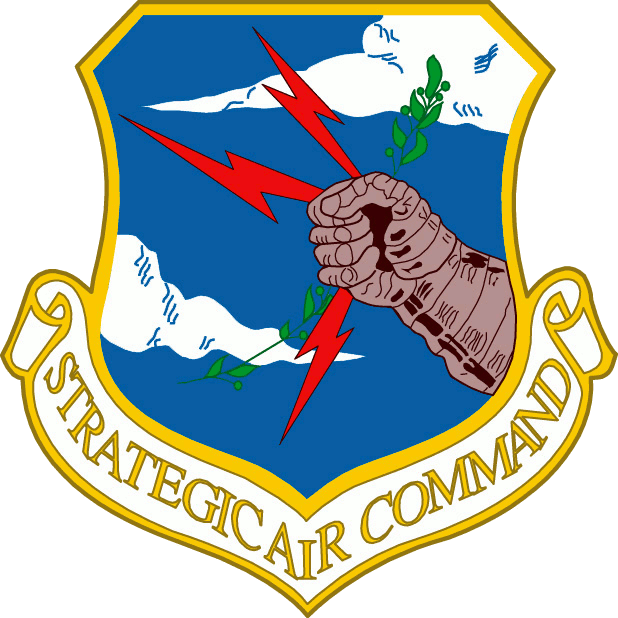
4080th Strategic Reconnaissance Wing

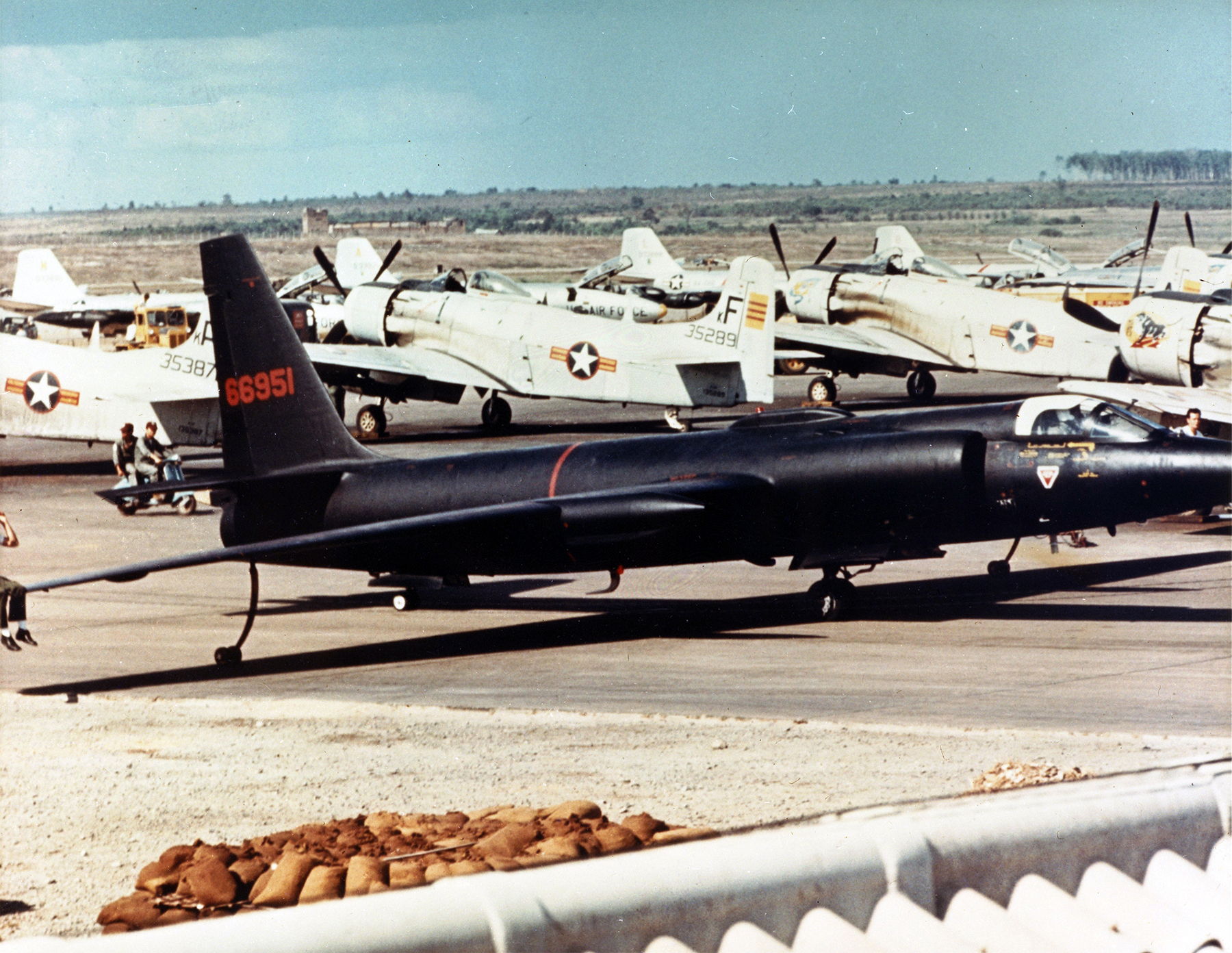
- 4028 Strategic Reconnaissance Squadron Lockheed U-2D, AF Ser. No. 56-6591, at Bien Hoa AB in 1965
- Active: 1956–1966
- Country: United States
- Branch: United States Air Force
- Type: strategic reconnaissance
- Part of: Strategic Air Command
- Decorations: Air Force Outstanding Unit Award

Commanders
- Notable commanders: Lt Gen Gerald W. Johnson

Insignia
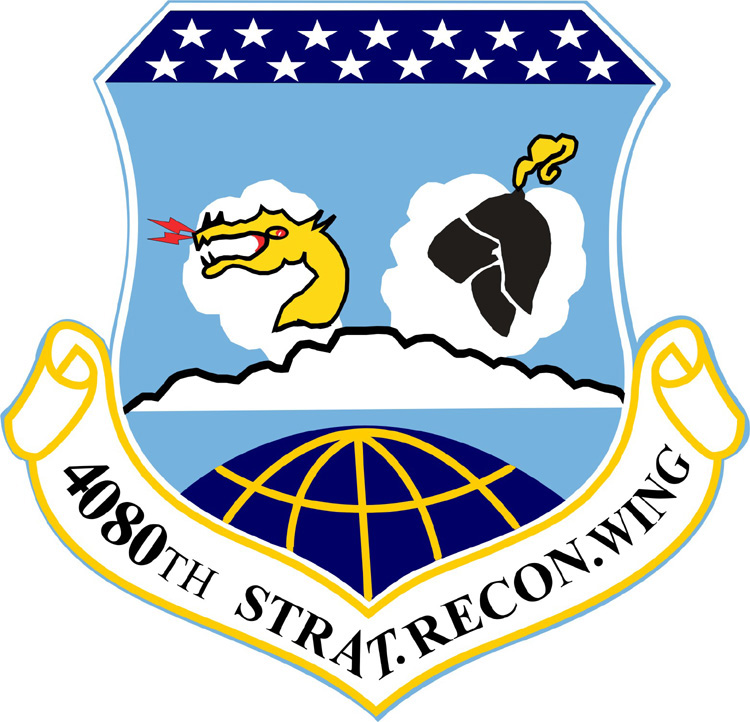
- 4080th Strategic Reconnaissance Wing emblem

The 4080th Strategic Reconnaissance Wing is a discontinued United States Air Force (USAF) wing last assigned to the 12th Strategic Aerospace Division of Strategic Air Command (SAC) at Davis–Monthan AFB, Arizona. It was SAC's high altitude reconnaissance wing for its existence and was the first USAF wing to operate the Lockheed U-2. It was discontinued as part of a program to replace operational units controlled by major commands with those controlled by USAF whose lineages could be continued.

== History ==
The wing was first organized as the 4080th Strategic Reconnaissance Wing, Light in 1956 at Turner AFB, Georgia. Its origins begin on 3 November 1955 with the formation of the 4025th Strategic Reconnaissance Squadron at Lockbourne AFB, Ohio.

- The 4025th Strategic Reconnaissance Squadron was the first SAC squadron to receive the RB-57D Canberra high-altitude reconnaissance version of the Martin-built Canberra.
- The 4028th Strategic Reconnaissance Squadron was programmed to be the first SAC squadron to receive the Lockheed U-2 Strategic Reconnaissance aircraft.
- The 4029th Strategic Reconnaissance Squadron was also programmed to receive the Lockheed U-2, although this unit was never assigned aircraft or personnel. The 4029th SRS was never assigned personnel or aircraft.

In June 1956, the 4028th was redesignated Strategic Reconnaissance Squadron, Weather and delivery of the Lockheed U-2 aircraft to the 4028th started in June 1957. Prior to this, all U-2 flying was performed by the Central Intelligence Agency (CIA).

=== 4025th Strategic Reconnaissance Squadron Operations ===
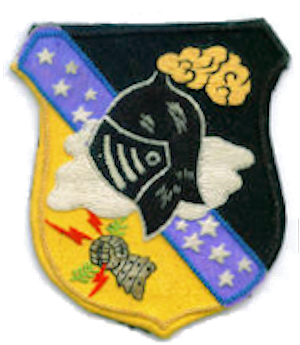
4025th Strategic Reconnaissance Squadron emblem

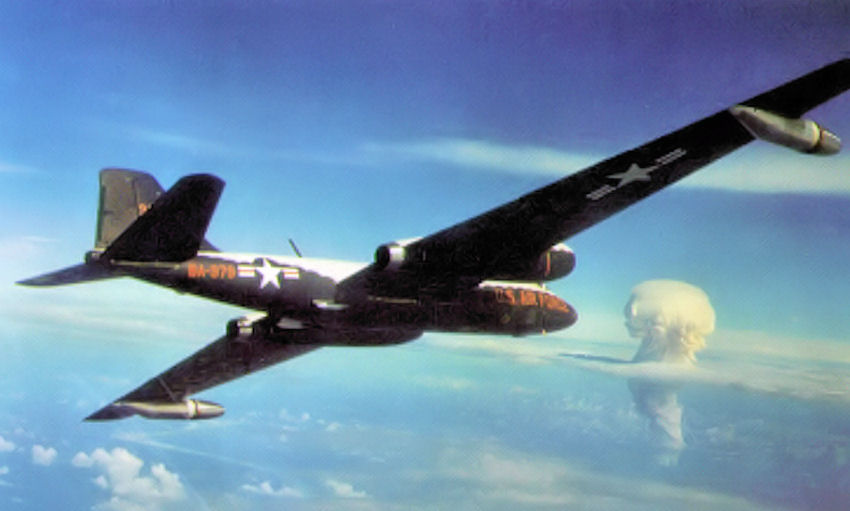
RB-57D, AF Ser. No. 53-3979, during Operation Hardtack I

The 4025th squadron received the initial RB-57D aircraft accepted by the Air Force. It also operated four B-57Cs, which were used for training. The first RB-57s arrived in May 1956 and eleven were on hand by the end of September. The RB-57D was a highly modified version of the B-57C. The crew was reduced to a single pilot; the 64-foot wingspan was increased to 105 feet; more powerful Pratt & Whitney J57 engines replaced the J65s and all but the first six planes were equipped for air refueling. These aircraft also had a number of mission specific modifications. Six of the planes were RB-57D-2s specializing in electronic intelligence (ELINT) missions and returned to two-man configuration to allow for an electronic reconnaissance operator in addition to the pilot,

Following operational training, RB-57D detachments were sent to Yokota Air Base, Japan (Det 1) under Operation Sea Lion and to Eielson AFB, Alaska (Det 2). The Alaskan detachment carried out ELINT operations around the Kamchatka Peninsula. On 11 December 1956 a mission over and around Vladivistok (USSR) was flown early in the morning. The Japanese-based RB-57Ds gathered Electronic Intelligence on Soviet naval and air force operations in the Far East and monitored airborne radiation samples from Soviet nuclear tests. Some sorties were flown over Communist China, the RB-57D's operational ceiling being well above that of Chinese MiG-15s.

Missions included Sky Shield, Toy Soldier and Green Hornet which were classified surveillance programs, which later would be performed by the U-2's of the 4028th SRS. Between March and August 1958 the RB-57Ds Flew air sampling flights from the Marshall Islands, Eniwetok Proving Ground in conjunction with the USA Nuclear testing program (Code name Hardtack).

Wing failures gradually took their toll, and these had caused SAC to place several RB-57Ds into storage by early 1959. The 4025th SRS was discontinued in June 1959. Some of the RB-57Ds that had been operating with the 4025th SRS were adapted to other specialist roles. Some were used by NASA for high-altitude flight testing and terrain mapping, whereas four were assigned to the 4677th Radar Evaluation Squadron for calibration duties. Six more RB-57Ds were used to monitor the last series of American atmospheric nuclear tests which took place in 1962. Three RB-57Ds were assigned to the 1211th Test Squadron (Sampling) of the Military Air Transport Service Air Weather Service at Kirtland AFB in New Mexico and were re-designated WB-57D.

=== 4028th SRS Operations ===
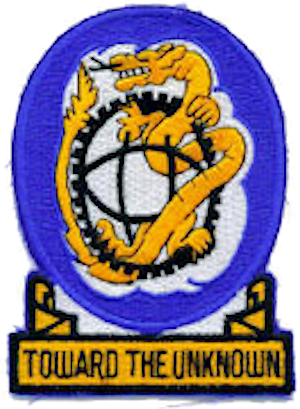
4028th Strategic Reconnaissance Squadron emblem

The initial mission of the 4028th SRS was the High Altitude Sampling Program (HASP) that was designed to sample the radioactive debris in the upper atmosphere following the detonation of Russian, Chinese and French Nuclear weapons. Unofficially this program was called "Crowflight".

Crowflight missions were initially flown from Ramey AFB, Puerto Rico (Det 3), and Plattsburgh AFB, New York (Det 4). The U-2 aircraft being used in these Crowflight missions were designated as WU-2A's which carried some of the sampling equipment in the aircraft nose. This resulted in the nose being flat at the tip to accommodate the sampling device. Further sampling inlets were carried on the port side just in front of the Nose wheel well. Filter membranes were placed inside these units and after flying through the radioactive clouds the membranes were sent for analysis. From this test the strength and make up of the Nuclear device could be determined. Aircraft flew in a Straight line, North to South and then reversed course, hence the mission name of Crowflight (as the crow fly's).

As a result of the 1963 Partial Nuclear Test Ban Treaty, the HASP program had been terminated, so all U-2 aircraft had the HASP air sampling equipment removed and were refitted with photo and electronic (PHOTINT & ELINT) collection gear

=== Cuban Missile Crisis ===
The 4080th SRW then moved to Laughlin AFB, Texas on 1 April 1957 and was designated the 4080th Strategic Wing on 15 June 1960.

4028th SRS pilots played a major role in preventing a global war during the Cuban Missile Crisis. In the summer of 1962, shipments of people and equipment from the USSR to Cuba increased dramatically. Despite Soviet Premier Nikita S. Khrushchev's denial, President John F. Kennedy directed SAC to begin U-2 high-altitude reconnaissance flights over the island. After high-altitude reconnaissance flights over Cuba, Majors Richard Heyser and Rudolf Anderson returned with pictures of ballistic missile sites and nuclear storage facilities under construction. President John F. Kennedy addressed the nation 22 October and six tense days followed while Heyser, Anderson and several other U-2 pilots from the 4080th continued reconnaissance flights over Cuba from a forward operating location established at McCoy AFB, Florida for the duration of the crisis. While negotiations between the two superpowers were still under way, Major Anderson attempted another reconnaissance run and his U-2 was shot down and he was killed. He was posthumously awarded the Air Force Cross, the first time the decoration had ever been awarded.

=== Vietnam War ===
The 4080th SRW moved from Laughlin AFB, Texas to Davis–Monthan AFB, Arizona on 1 July 1963. During this move they had a small group of people assigned/attached who were working on the classified programme "Lightning Bug" which were photo reconnaissance drones.

On 31 December 1963 President Lyndon B. Johnson issued the order for the 4080th SRW to support the reconnaissance effort in South Vietnam. The wing had been at Davis Monthan for less than a year. They moved a detachment of three 4028th SRS U-2E aircraft (#347, #370 & #374) to Bien Hoa Air Base to supplement the tactical reconnaissance being undertaken by the F-101s. The Bien Hoa operation was designated as Operating Location-20 (OL-20), under the code names "Lucky Dragon" for the 4028th SRS's U-2E Dragon Lady, and "Blue Springs" for the DC-130/Ryan AQM-34 Firbee drone detachment operation.

The DC-130/Drone operation originally deployed to Kadena Air Base, Okinawa before being re-positioned at Bien Hoa. In July 1965 this drone detachment became the 4025th Reconnaissance Squadron as the squadron number was reactivated. The 4025th originally being the RB-57D unit, and still used the "Black Knights" emblem from their previous role with the RB-57D although officially they were not supposed to.

Initially the three U-2s deployed to Vietnam on 11 February 1964 flying to Hickam Air Force Base, Hawaii and then on to Clark Air Base in the Philippines on 12 February The U-2s were only Clark but only for a short time, as Philippine President Ferdinand Marcos was not told of the U-2 coming to the Philippines and was so disturbed that he gave the USAF, 72 hours to get the "Spy Planes" out of the country. The aircraft were quickly moved to Andersen AFB in Guam, and finally after some weeks of inactivity to Bien Hoa as OL-20 on 5 March with operations starting also most immediately.

These flights were to start with restrictions in the areas of operations as there was still a CIA U-2 in the theatre of operation. The CIA was covering the flights over Communist China and North Vietnam from Takhli RTAFB, Thailand and these could be still classed as a civilian flight if one was downed. The Americans were still at the time only "Advisors" at this point in the Vietnam War. This changed and SAC took on the role left by the CIA's Detachment G at Takhli withdrawing their aircraft and operations on 24 April.

The U-2’s began operations to gather intelligence on North Vietnam – initially known as "Lucky Dragon" this project was renamed 'Trojan Horse', then 'Olympic Torch', 'Senior Book' and finally 'Giant Dragon'. The sorties involved flying along North Vietnam and Chinese borders, generally gathering SIGINT, The U-2 flights also monitored the roads and trails from North Vietnam that were being used to send both weapons and personnel into South Vietnam and the surrounding states of Laos and Cambodia. They also supplied the target data for the forthcoming deployment of the B-57 Canberra tactical bombers to South Vietnam.

As the war progressed the U-2's had to move to operating at higher altitudes as first the Mig-17 and then MiG-21s were introduced making flights at medium altitude a risky business. Also the introduction of SAM-2 missiles by the North Vietnamese necessitated the careful planning of flight routes to bypass these hot spots.

The 4080th was a SAC major command controlled (MAJCON) wing, and in order to retain the lineage of its MAJCOM 4-digit combat units and to perpetuate the lineage of many currently inactive bombardment units with illustrious World War II records, Headquarters SAC received authority from Headquarters USAF to discontinue its MAJCON wings that were equipped with combat aircraft and to activate inactive Air Force controlled (AFCON) units, most of which were inactive at the time which could carry a lineage and history. As a result, the 4080th SRW designation was discontinued and its mission, equipment and personnel transferred to the 100th Strategic Reconnaissance Wing in June 1966. Its 4028th SRS, flying U-2s was replaced by the 349th Strategic Reconnaissance Squadron and the 4025th SRS, with its DC-130 Hercules aircraft and BQM-24 Firebee drones, was replaced by the 350th Strategic Reconnaissance Squadron.

== Lineage ==
- Activated [sic] as the 4080th Strategic Reconnaissance Wing, Light on 2 May 1956 (Note: So in source, but at this time MAJCON units like the 4080th were not "activated", they were "organized.")

Redesignated 4080th Strategic Wing on 15 June 1960
Discontinued on 25 June 1966

=== Assignments ===
- 40th Air Division, 1 May 1956
- Second Air Force, 1 April 1957
- 12th Strategic Air Division, 1 July 1963 – 25 June 1965

=== Components ===
Groups

- 864th Medical Group, 1 May 1959 – 1 April 1962
- 4080th Air Base Group (later 4080th Combat Support Group), 1 April 1957 – 1 April 1962

Hospital

- 4080th USAF Hospital, 1 April 1957 – 1 May 1959

Operational Squadrons

- 4025th Strategic Reconnaissance Squadron, Light, 1 May 1956 – 15 June 1960
- 4025th Strategic Reconnaissance Squadron, 1 July 1965 – 25 June 1966
- 4028th Strategic Reconnaissance Squadron (later 4028th Strategic Reconnaissance Squadron, Weather), 1 May 1956 – 15 June 1966
- 4029th Strategic Reconnaissance Squadron, 1 May 1956 – 1 January 1960

Support Squadrons

- 4080th Armament & Electronics Maintenance Squadron (later 4080th Avionics Maintenance Squadron), 1 May 1956 – 25 Jun 66
- 4080th Field Maintenance Squadron, 1 May 1956 – 25 Jun 66
- 4080th Periodic Maintenance Squadron (later 4080th Organizational Maintenance Squadron), 1 May 1956 – 25 Jun 66

=== Stations ===
- Turner Air Force Base, Georgia, 1 May 1956
- Laughlin Air Force Base, Texas, 1 April 1957
- Davis–Monthan Air Force Base, Arizona, 1 July 1963 – 25 June 1966

Wing elements deployed to Bien Hoa Air Base, South Vietnam, 5 March 1964 – 25 June 1966

=== Aircraft/missiles assigned ===
- Lockheed U-2, 1957–1966
- RB-57D Canberra, 1956–1960
- Lockheed DC-130, 1966
- Ryan BQM-34 Firebee 1966
- NB-57B Canberra, early 1960s

=== Awards ===
Award streamer	Award	Dates	Notes
	Air Force Outstanding Unit Award	1 August 1957 – 1 September 1959	
	Air Force Outstanding Unit Award	2 September 1959 – 24 August 1962	
	Air Force Outstanding Unit Award	11 February 1964 – 30 April 1965	
	Air Force Outstanding Unit Award	1 May 1965 – 25 June 1966	
