= Dancing with Death (Vietnam War) =

"Dancing with Death" was the satirical term used by US Air Force combat pilots to describe evasive maneuvering while facing advanced Soviet surface-to-air missiles (SAMs) over Vietnam.

At the onset of the Vietnam War, US pilots had carte blanche over Vietnamese airspace. During the initial stages of the conflict, poorly equipped Vietnamese air defense forces were unable to shoot down high-altitude US aircraft using World War II-vintage guns. When they asked for assistance, their chief ally, the Soviet Union, was initially apprehensive but eventually decided to supply S-75 Dvina (reporting name SA-2 Guideline) SAM systems. About 1000 Soviet specialists arrived Vietnam in April 1965. Generous and massive Soviet military aid, consisting of SAMs, MiG fighters, and Kalashnikov rifles, enabled Vietnam to become a formidable belligerent.

In the initial stages of the conflict, US combat pilots referred to anti-aircraft missiles as Russian-made "telephone poles." However, the S-75 missile gained attention in 1960 when it was used to shoot down U-2 of Francis Gary Powers overflying the Soviet Union, and then again when, during Cuban Missile Crisis, a S-75 system shot down another U-2 (piloted by Rudolf Anderson).

The situation changed drastically after the introduction of sophisticated Soviet Anti-aircraft systems. 7658 missiles and 95 S-75 Missile Systems were delivered between 1965 and 1972. Most of the systems were extensively deployed in the periphery of the Hanoi-Haiphong area and US intelligence and reconnaissance flights detected the employment of S-75 systems almost immediately by 5 April 1965. It was in August 1965 that first high- altitude SAMs were fired against the USAF over Vietnam; out of four F-4 Phantom II jets encaged in the first action, three were knocked down. During the first few days US pilots were helpless but soon they developed tactics to dodge anti-aircraft missile systems. The aggressive, missile-evading maneuvers and tactics were jokingly referred to as "Dancing with Death." The pilots generally had only few seconds to react and failure meant certain death. To avoid being hit, pilots would employ high-G turns, low level flying, and turning toward the sun (to spoof infrared seekers).

American commanders were surprised and impressed that Vietnam, deemed to be a pastoral state, could operate such advanced SAM systems. Americans not only devised tactics but decided to suppress the threat caused by Soviet-supplied anti-aircraft systems. They created special units armed with AGM-45 Shrike anti-radiation missile designed to home in on hostile anti-aircraft radar, and special units, named Wild Weasels, to use the new weapon systems and tactics. The launch platforms of these missiles were the A-4 Skyhawk, A-6 Intruder, F-105 Thunderchief, and F-4 Phantom II aircraft. Soviet specialist upgraded S-75 systems on periodic basis and improved its resistance to jamming.
