= William Matheny =

William Matheny may refer to:

- William A. Matheny (1902–1973), American pilot
- William Matheny (musician), American singer-songwriter
