= Richard S. Heyser =

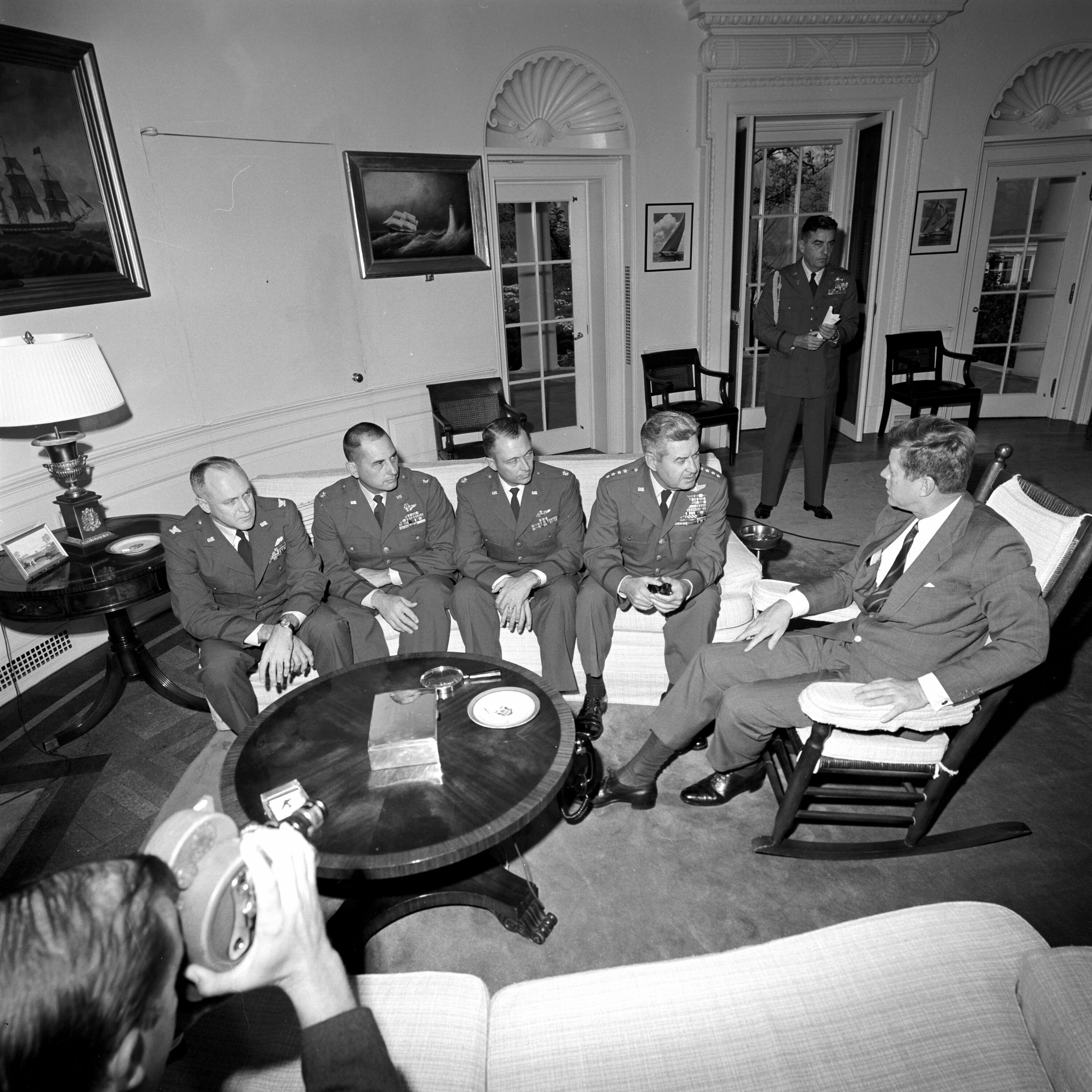
- Heyser (3rd from left) with General Curtis E. LeMay and President John F. Kennedy.
- Born: April 3, 1927; Apalachicola, Florida, U.S.
- Died: October 6, 2008 (aged 81); Port St. Joe, Florida, U.S.
- Military career
- Allegiance: United States
- Branch: United States Air Force
- Service years: 1944–1974
- Rank: Lieutenant colonel

Richard S. Heyser (3 April 1927 – 6 October 2008), Lieutenant Colonel, USAF (Retired), was a pilot in the United States Air Force whose photographs while flying the Lockheed U-2 revealed Soviet medium-range ballistic missiles in Cuba, precipitating the Cuban Missile Crisis in October 1962. He joined the United States Army Air Forces in 1944 and flew combat missions in both the Korean War and the Vietnam War.

== Early life and career ==
Heyser, a native of Apalachicola, Florida, joined the United States Army Air Forces in 1944, at the age of 17, after watching World War II pilots training at nearby Tyndall Field. His father was a United States Coast Guard Auxiliary aviator. Following the war, Heyser graduated from what would become Florida State University.

He began USAF pilot training in 1952, flying combat missions during both the Korean War and two combat deployments during the Vietnam War. In the late 1950s into the 1960s, he flew Lockheed U-2s with the 4080th Strategic Reconnaissance Wing, first qualifying on the U-2 on 19 February 1957, the 50th pilot to check out on the spy plane.

== Cuban Missile Crisis ==
Early Sunday morning, 14 October 1962, then-Major Heyser climbed into CIA U-2F, Article 342, (the second U-2, modified for in-flight refueling), hastily repainted as 'USAF 66675', at Edwards Air Force Base, California, where he had just undergone qualification on the type, and departed on a Cuban overflight, Mission 3101, dubbed Brass Knob.

"He met the sun over the Gulf of Mexico, and flew over the Yucatán Channel before turning north to penetrate denied territory. The weather was roughly as forecast: 25% cloud cover. He was flying the maximum altitude profile, and by this time the U-2F had reached 72,500 feet. There was no contrail. Heyser switched on the camera and did his stuff. He was over the island for less than seven minutes, but his potential exposure to the two Surface-to-air missile sites was over 12 minutes. Heyser had been briefed to scan the driftsight for Cuban fighters or, worse still, an SA-2 heading his way. If so, he was briefed to turn sharply towards it, and then away from it, in an S-pattern that would hopefully break the missile radar's lock. But there was no opposition from Cuba's air defenses. Heyser coasted-out and headed for McCoy Air Force Base, Florida. He landed there at 0920 EST after exactly seven hours in the air."

The film was immediately flown to Washington, D.C. to the National Photographic Intelligence Center for processing, with the first images trucked under armed guard where analysts at NPIC identified SS-4 missile transporters by noon. This, and other evidence on the films, set in motion the Cuban Missile Crisis. On 22 October, President John F. Kennedy announced that Colonel Heyser's photographs proved the Soviet Union was building secret sites for nuclear missiles only 90 miles from Key West. The crisis ended after Soviet Premier Nikita Khrushchev ordered the missiles withdrawn from Cuba.

Lieutenant Colonel Heyser said, in a 2005 interview with the Associated Press, that nobody was more relieved than he that the crisis ended peacefully, and that he had no desire to go down in history as the man who started World War III. "I kind of felt like I was going to be looked at as the one who started the whole thing", Heyser said. "I wasn't anxious to have that reputation."

== Later life ==
Heyser retired from the Air Force in 1974 after 30 years of service and returned to Apalachicola. He died at a nursing home in Port St. Joe, Florida, near his home in Apalachicola, on 6 October 2008 at age 81. He had suffered a series of strokes in the years before his death.
