= Cheney Award =

Aviation award presented by the US Air Force

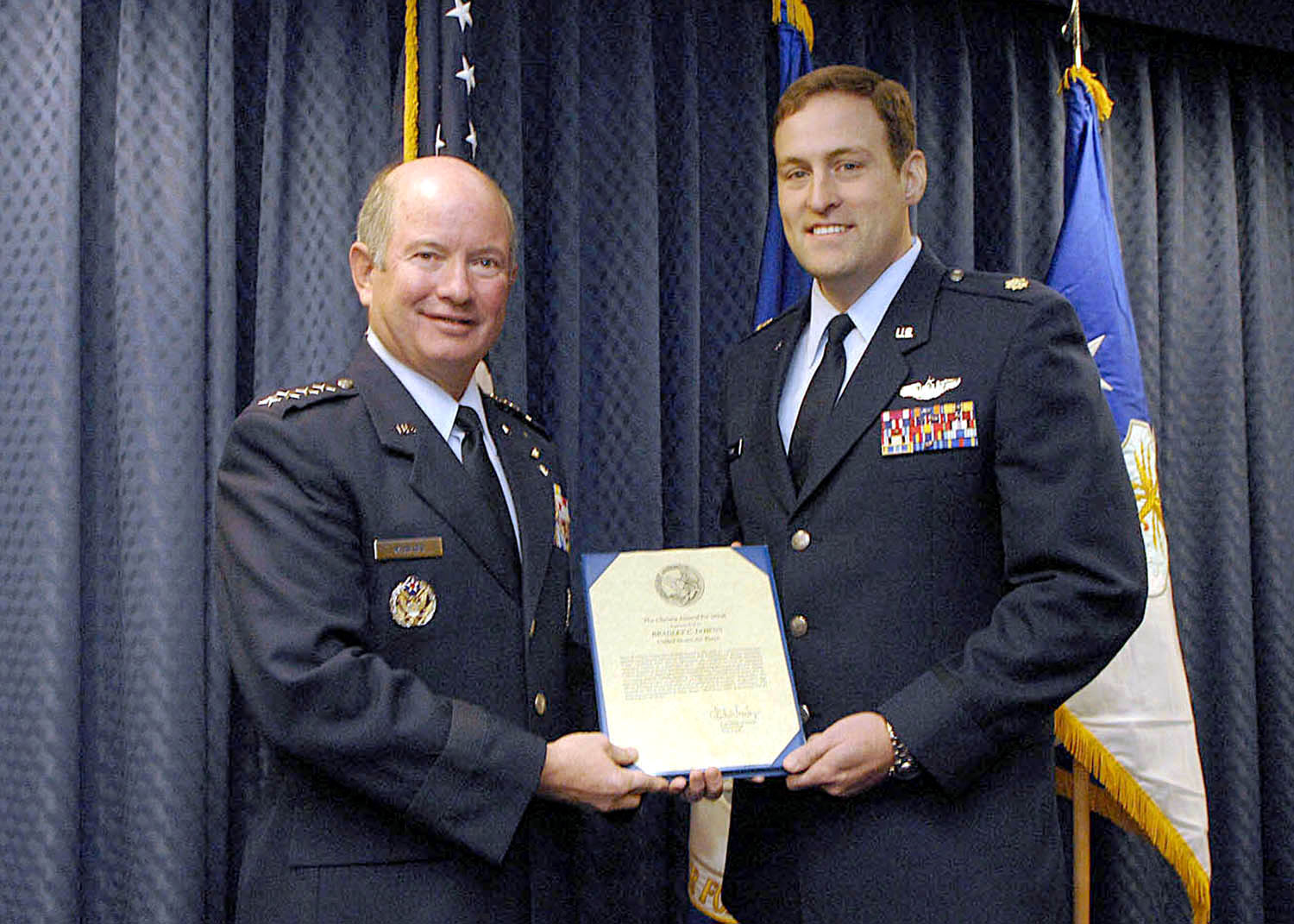
Air Force Vice Chief of Staff Gen. Duncan J. McNabb presents Maj. Bradley Downs USAF with the Cheney Award in 2007

The Cheney Award is an aviation award presented by the United States Air Force in memory of 1st Lt. William H. Cheney, who was killed in an air collision over Foggia, Italy on January 20, 1918. It was established in 1927, and is awarded to an airman for an act of valor, extreme fortitude or self-sacrifice in a humanitarian interest, performed in connection with aircraft, but not necessarily of a military nature.

== Past Awardees ==
- 1927 MSgt Harry A. Chapman - First Recipient of the award for actions at the Roma airship crash
- 1928 2Lt Uzal Girard Ent
- 1929 William Albert Matheny
- 1930 No Award
- 1931 Lt R.D. Moor and Pvt J.B. Smith
- 1932 Pfc Arden M. Farley
- 1933 2Lt William L. Bogen, SSgt Doy D. Dodd, Sgt Thomas J. Rogers
- 1935 1Lt Robert K. Giovannoli
- 1936 Maj Frederick D. Lynch, SSgt Joseph L. Murray
- 1939 1Lt Harold L. Neely
- 1946 Sgt Larry Lambert - first live subject of a US ejector seat
- 1948 Col Gail S. Halvorsen
- 1949 Capt. William E. Blair
- 1950 Sgt. Paul Prosper Ramoneda
- 1951 Capt. Daniel J. Miller
- 1952 Capt. Kendrick U. Reeves
- 1953 Capt. Edward G. Sperry
- 1954 Col. John Stapp
- 1955 William Sutherland
- 1956 MSgt. Leonard J. Bachetti
- 1957 First Lieutenant Robert M. Kerr
- 1959 Capt Herbert L. Mattox, Jr
- 1960 Capt Alfred S. Despres Jr
- 1961 1Lt William A. Luther and MSgt Lawrence G. Seckley
- 1962 Maj. Rudolf Anderson, Jr
- 1965 Capt James A Darden, Jr and Capt Robert S Henderson
- 1967 A1C Duane Hackney
- 1968 Sgt Thomas Newman
- 1969 Sgt Isidro Arroyo Jr
- 1970 Maj Travis Wofford
- 1974 Capt Steven L. Bennett
- 1975 1LT Regina Aune (First woman to win the Cheney trophy)
- 1977 SSgt James T. Carter
- 1979 Capt Kenneth R. Rees and TSgt John L. Pighini
- 1980 Capt Ronald W. Summers and 1Lt Kim F.P. Skrinak
- 1981 TSgt David J. Gerke and TSgt Tommie C. Wood
- 1982 Capt. Greg Engelbreit and Capt. Fred Wilson
- 1983 SSgt Jeffrey Yates Jones (posthumous)
- 1984 Captain John C. Ritchie
- 1985 Major Larry Clemons
- 1986 Capt Scott A. Chavez
- 1988 TSGT William A Wray
- 1990 Capt John M. Roush
- 1992 Major Richard Brian Mcnabb and Major Stephen J. Laushine
- 1993 John L. Brainerd
- 1994 SrA Matthew A. Wells and SrA Jesse W. Goerz
- 1995 Capt. Charles M. Moncrief and Capt. Charles M. Harmon
- 1996 Major Marshall B. "Brad" Webb
- 2000 TSgt. Jeanne M. Vogt (First enlisted woman to be awarded the Cheney Award)
- 2001 TSgt. Thomas Fields
- 2002 Majl Kevin Churchill and Capt. Sean LeRoy
- 2003 1Lt. Randell Voas and 1Lt. Craig Prather
- 2004 Maj. John Groves
- 2005 SSgt Patrick Mortell
- 2007 Maj. Brad Downs and Maj Dan Roesch
- 2008 Capt. Chad Bubanas
- 2009 Maj. John G. Mangan
- 2010 Maj. John Foy and Capt. Patrick Markey
- 2011 Capt. Kenneth Green and Master Sgt. Joseph Brownell
- 2012 Capt. Thaddeus L Ronnau, Lt Pace Stead, SSgt Michael Brooks, SrA Jay Bossy
- 2013 MSgt William T. Fritsch
- 2015 Capt. Melonie Parmley and SSgt Eric McElroy
- 2016 MSgt Christian M. Egger
- 2018 Maj. Kyle T. Waite
- 2026 Capt. McClain Cardoso

== See also ==
- List of aviation awards
- Ruth Cheney Streeter sister of William H. Cheney
