= Daniel J. Miller =

United States Air Force officer

Daniel J. Miller Jr.
- Born: March 13, 1924; Stony Point, New York, U.S.
- Died: September 1, 2006 (aged 82); Indialantic, Florida, U.S.
- Military career
- Allegiance: United States of America
- Branch: Air Force
- Rank: Lieutenant colonel
- Commands: 13th Tactical Air Support

Lt. Colonel Daniel J. Miller (March 13, 1924 – September 1, 2006) was a United States Air Force officer who served in World War II, the Korean War, and the Vietnam War. He served as a navigator for bombers in World War II, and as a helicopter pilot assigned largely to rescue missions in Korea and Vietnam. In Korea he made a number of notable rescues and was awarded a Silver Star and a Cheney Award. In between wars he served as an instructor, frequently flying fighter planes.

== Personal life ==
Daniel J. Miller was born in Stony Point, New York on March 13, 1924, to John J. and Kathryn Miller. He attended Stony Point High School where he lettered in two sports and graduated in 1942. He met his wife, Julia Veronica Miller (Brophy) in high school and they married when Miller returned from WWII. Julia was born on September 12, 1924, to Frank and Julia Brophy and was raised in Grassy Point, New York. They had six children, Dan, Michael, Kevin, Tim, Julie, and Mark.

Miller died September 1, 2006, in Indialantic, Florida.

== World War II ==
He enlisted in the Army Air Corp in January 1943 during World War II. Before going abroad, he trained at the Pueblo Army Air Base, attending navigation school. Upon graduation, he was commissioned a second lieutenant. In November 1944, he was assigned to the 484th Bombardment Group engaged in Italy with the 15th Air Force. In WWII he occasionally served as a gunner but served primarily as a navigator on B-24 Liberators. While stationed in Italy he flew 25 missions over Germany and was awarded with the Distinguished Flying Cross. He served with the 484th until 1945 and he was promoted to 1st lieutenant at the end of the war. In WWII, he was also awarded with the Air Medal with three clusters and the European Theater Ribbon with four battle stars.

== Korean War ==
After the war, he trained to become a pilot and in March 1947, he graduated in class 47-A at Williams Field in Chandler, Arizona, earning his pilot's wings. In October 1950, during the Korean War, he was sent to Korea with the 3rd Air Rescue Service. There, he piloted H-5 helicopters flying wounded from the front line and often flying pilots whose planes have crash-landed or been shot down behind enemy lines.

On February 7, 1951, Miller and Lt. Earnest L. MacQuarrie piloted a pair of helicopters in what was called one of the most daring air rescues of the war of eight infantrymen. At the outset of that rescue, MacQuarrie's helicopter stayed in the air initially to help direct fire from the support F-80 fighter planes. When North Korean forces opened fire on the trapped men, Miller shot at them with his .45 pistol, allowing MacQuarrie to see the location of the enemy soldiers and direct the support fighters who bombed them with napalm. In September 1952, Miller was awarded the Cheney Award for this rescue. The Cheney Award was established in honor of Lt. William Cheney who was killed in an air collision over Foggia, Italy in 1928. The award may be given every year, although it had only been rarely awarded between its establishment and Cheney receiving the award in 1952.

In another rescue, Miller piloted a helicopter to rescue Major Frank H. Presley, a downed airman near Munsan. This mission was performed under severe fire and as Miller was leaving he attempted a second rescue of Captain Willis R. Brown, whose escort fighter had been shot down by anti-aircraft fire. Brown did not eject and had already died, and Miller aborted that second rescue. He would be awarded a Silver Star for this mission.

By July, Miller had flown 63 rescue missions. In a nod to his performance, he was one of two pilots given the mission to fly Allied officer-delegates to peace talks at Kaesong along with Lt. Harold W. Moore. In that mission he took colonel rank officers to a conference which could have paved the way for later negotiations, although the talks would ultimately fail.

Miller continued to fly rescue missions, and in September, Miller and pilots Lt. Michael Angelo Mecca, Lt. Charles J. Dupont, and Lt. Leonard A. Hughes were credited with a rescue of 14 Army engineers who had been working on a section of a pontoon bridge which had torn away from the rest at Imjin River.

After the war, Williams became an instructor-pilot at Williams Air Force Base. He was later assigned to the 81st Fighter Group at Wheeler Field, Hawaii where he flew the P-47 and P-51 fighters, and then at Moses Lake, Washington where he served as a jet pilot. In 1960 he graduated from the Air Command and Staff College at Maxwell Air Force Base in Alabama and then was assigned to the Air Training Command, and he became an instructor for F-80, F-84, and F-86 fighters. In 1967, he was given special recognition for helping his unit win the coveted U.S. Air Force Outstanding Unit award.

== Vietnam War ==
During the Vietnam War, Miller flew rescue missions and commanded the 19th Tactical Air Support Squadron. Two sons served in Vietnam; in 1968, Daniel, Jr. was stationed in Vietnam with the 281st Assault Helicopter Company. Kevin Miller served in Vietnam in the infantry as part of 1st Cavalry.
