= Steven L. Bennett =

US Air Force officer and posthumous recipient of the Medal of Honor

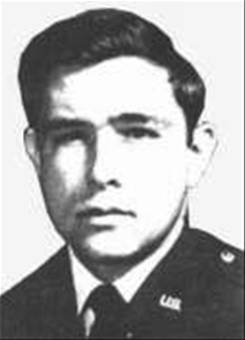
- Born: April 22, 1946; Palestine, Texas, U.S.
- Died: June 29, 1972 (aged 26); Gulf of Tonkin, off Quang Tri Province, Republic of Vietnam
- Burial place: Lafayette Memorial Cemetery, Lafayette, Louisiana
- Military career
- Allegiance: United States of America
- Branch: United States Air Force
- Service years: 1968–1972
- Rank: Captain
- Units: 20th Tactical Air Support Squadron; Pacific Air Forces
- Conflicts: Vietnam War; Second Battle of Quảng Trị †
- Awards: Medal of Honor; Purple Heart (2); Air Medal (4); Cheney Award

Steven Logan Bennett (April 22, 1946 – June 29, 1972) was a United States Air Force pilot who posthumously received the Medal of Honor for heroism during the Vietnam War.

== Early life ==
Bennett was born on 1946 in Palestine, Texas, but grew up in Lafayette, Louisiana. He graduated from Youngsville High School in 1964 and then went on to attend Southwestern Louisiana Institute, where he graduated with a Bachelor of Science degree in aeronautical engineering.

== Military career ==
On August 12, 1968, Bennett was commissioned a second lieutenant in the U.S. Air Force through the Air Force ROTC program at the Southwestern Louisiana Institute, and in October 1969, he completed Undergraduate Pilot Training at Webb Air Force Base in Texas.

After completing combat crew training in the B-52 Stratofortress at Castle Air Force Base in California, Bennett was assigned to the 325th Bomb Squadron at Fairchild Air Force Base in Washington, in May 1970.

=== Vietnam war ===
In his first tour of duty in Southeast Asia from September to December 1970, Bennett flew combat missions in the B-52 from U-Tapao Royal Thai Navy Airfield. After returning to the United States, he completed conversion training to the OV-10 Bronco and was assigned as a forward air controller with the 20th Tactical Air Support Squadron at Da Nang Air Base in South Vietnam in late April 1972.

=== Medal of Honor action ===
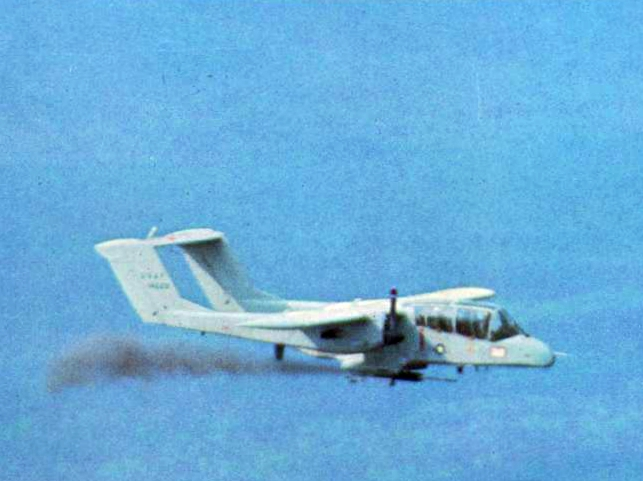
U.S. Air Force North American OV-10A Bronco fires a rocket over Vietnam, circa in 1969

On June 29, 1972, Captain Bennett was flying an OV-10 Bronco on an artillery adjustment mission in Quảng Trị province, South Vietnam. A Marine gunfire spotter occupied the rear seat of the OV-10.

After controlling gunfire from U.S. Navy ships offshore and directing air strikes against enemy positions for approximately three hours, Bennett received an urgent call for assistance. A small South Vietnamese Army unit was about to be attacked by a much larger North Vietnamese force. Without immediate help, the unit was certain to be overrun. Unfortunately, there were no friendly fighters left in the area, and supporting naval gunfire would have endangered the South Vietnamese.

As a result, Bennett decided to strafe the advancing enemy soldiers. Since they were North Vietnamese regulars, equipped with heat-seeking 9K32 Strela-2 missiles, the risks in making a low-level attack were great. Bennett nonetheless zoomed down and opened fire. The troops scattered and began to fall back under repeated strafing. As Bennett pulled up from his fifth attack, an enemy soldier fired a missile at the aircraft and struck the OV-10's left engine. The explosion set the engine on fire and knocked the left landing gear from its stowed position, leaving it hanging down. The canopies over the two airmen were pierced by fragments.

Bennett veered southward to find a field for an emergency landing. As the fire in the engine continued to spread, he was urged by the pilot of an escorting OV-10 to eject, as the wing of Bennett's OV-10 was in danger of exploding. Bennett then learned that his observer's parachute had been shredded by fragments in the explosion. Bennett then elected to ditch in the Gulf of Tonkin, although he knew that his cockpit area would very likely break up on impact. As Bennett touched down, the extended landing gear dug into the water. The OV-10 spun to the left and flipped over nose down into the sea. His Marine companion managed to escape, but Bennett, trapped in his smashed cockpit, sank with the plane. Bennett's body was recovered the next day.

For sacrificing his life, Bennett was posthumously awarded the Medal of Honor. The decoration was presented to his widow by Vice President of the United States Gerald Ford on August 8, 1974.

== Awards and decorations ==

USAF pilot badge
Medal of Honor		Purple Heart with bronze oak leaf cluster
Air Medal with three bronze oak leaf clusters	Air Force Commendation Medal	Air Force Outstanding Unit Award with "V" device and bronze oak leaf cluster
National Defense Service Medal	Vietnam Service Medal with two bronze campaign stars	Air Force Longevity Service Award
Small Arms Expert Marksmanship Ribbon	Republic of Vietnam Gallantry Cross Unit Citation	Republic of Vietnam Campaign Medal

- Bennett posthumously also received the Cheney Award for his efforts to save his fellow airman at the risk of his own life.

=== Medal of Honor citation ===
The President of the United States takes pride in presenting the MEDAL OF HONOR posthumously to
CAPTAIN STEVEN L. BENNETT
UNITED STATES AIR FORCE
20th Tactical Air Support Squadron, Pacific Air Forces.
Place and date of action: Quang Tri, Republic of Vietnam, June 29, 1972.
For service as set forth in the following

Citation:

Capt. Bennett was the pilot of a light aircraft flying an artillery adjustment mission along a heavily defended segment of route structure. A large concentration of enemy troops was massing for an attack on a friendly unit. Capt. Bennett requested tactical air support but was advised that none was available. He also requested artillery support but this too was denied due to the close proximity of friendly troops to the target. Capt. Bennett was determined to aid the endangered unit and elected to strafe the hostile positions. After 4 such passes, the enemy force began to retreat. Capt. Bennett continued the attack, but, as he completed his fifth strafing pass, his aircraft was struck by a surface-to-air missile, which severely damaged the left engine and the left main landing gear. As fire spread in the left engine, Capt. Bennett realized that recovery at a friendly airfield was impossible. He instructed his observer to prepare for an ejection, but was informed by the observer that his parachute had been shredded by the force of the impacting missile. Although Capt. Bennett had a good parachute, he knew that if he ejected, the observer would have no chance of survival. With complete disregard for his own life, Capt. Bennett elected to ditch the aircraft into the Gulf of Tonkin, even though he realized that a pilot of this type aircraft had never survived a ditching. The ensuing impact upon the water caused the aircraft to cartwheel and severely damaged the front cockpit, making escape for Capt. Bennett impossible. The observer successfully made his way out of the aircraft and was rescued. Capt. Bennett's unparalleled concern for his companion, extraordinary heroism and intrepidity above and beyond the call of duty, at the cost of his life, were in keeping with the highest traditions of the military service and reflect great credit upon himself and the U.S. Air Force.

(signed) GERALD R. FORD

=== Other honors ===
Bennett is the namesake of the ship MV Capt. Steven L. Bennett (T-AK-4296) and his name is engraved on the Vietnam Memorial at Panel 01W - Row 051. There have been numerous other dedications held in his honor. They range from streets being named after him to buildings, including a gymnasium and a cafeteria, a sports arena and VFW posts, and many monuments. Bennett has been mentioned in several military history books. He has a public park named in his honor in Palestine, Texas.

== Personal life ==
Bennett and Linda Leveque were married in September 1968. They had one child, Angela Bennett Engele, who lives in the Dallas–Fort Worth area and is the current president of the OV-10 Association located in Fort Worth and the Volunteer Administrator (a volunteer position) for the Fort Worth Aviation Museum.

== See also ==
- List of Medal of Honor recipients for the Vietnam War
