= Cleveland Park (Greenville, South Carolina) =

Park in Greenville, South Carolina, US

Coordinates: 34°50′40″N 82°23′16″W

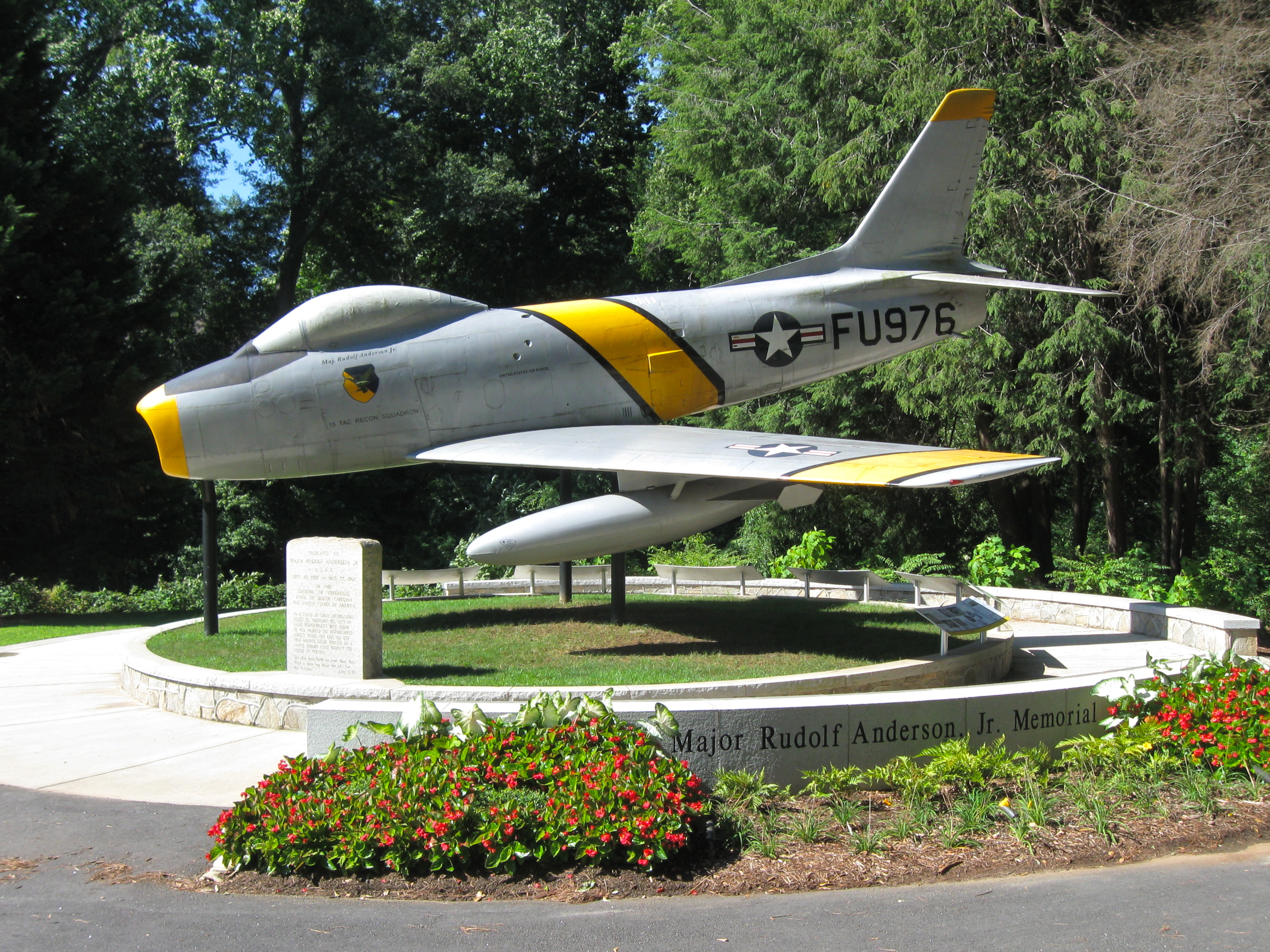
Rudolf Anderson Memorial in Cleveland Park

Cleveland Park is the largest park in Greenville, South Carolina, much of its more than 120 acres being greenway along Richland Creek and the Reedy River near the city's "most elegant neighborhoods."

On December 31, 1924, with encouragement from Greenville Park Commission chairman John Alexander McPherson, prominent Greenvillean William Choice Cleveland donated a crescent-shaped 110 acres on the southeast side of town to be used as a park and playground, a recreational area he hoped would complement his new housing development, Cleveland Forest, and would include an equestrian park and paddocks where residents could board their horses. (Stables managed by private owners existed adjacent to the park until they were demolished in 2014.) In 1925, the city of Greenville created two baseball fields, a horse ring, and a playground, and the park officially opened on January 1, 1926.

By 1928, during the administration of Mayor Richard Watson, when a $110,000 bond issue to develop the park was approved, the park was surveyed at 126 acres. Land around the river was boggy and prone to flooding, a deficiency partially remedied during the Great Depression when the WPA channelized the river bed, greatly improving drainage.

In its earliest years the park included a Girl Scout meeting place and a nine-hole public golf course, built and abandoned in the 1930s. A swimming pool and skating rink were added in 1929; but in 1964, during the Civil Rights Movement, the whites-only pool was closed to prevent it from being integrated. First a sea lion exhibit replaced the pool, then a rose garden; finally in 1988, tennis courts replaced both garden and skating rink.

In 1930, the Greenville Garden Club began to renovate a Civil-War era rock quarry into the Rock Quarry Garden. The garden won a Better Homes and Gardens award in 1932; but by the 1960s, it was neglected and overgrown. Another renovation project revitalized the garden in the 1980s, and in the 21st century, the Rock Quarry Garden became a popular wedding and reception venue.

In the 21st century, the park, now adjacent to the Greenville Zoo, included a softball field, volleyball and tennis courts, several playgrounds, a Vietnam Veterans Memorial, and eight picnic shelters. The Swamp Rabbit Trail runs through the park, and it also includes the Fernwood Nature Trail, the Ramona Graham Fitness Trail, and the Troop 19 Trail. A distinctive landmark is the memorial to Rudolf Anderson, a Greenville native shot down over Cuba in October 1962, the only American casualty of the Cuban Missile Crisis. The Anderson memorial features an F-86 Sabre and panels explaining Anderson's life and mission.
