= Rudolf Anderson =

USAF pilot (1927–1962)

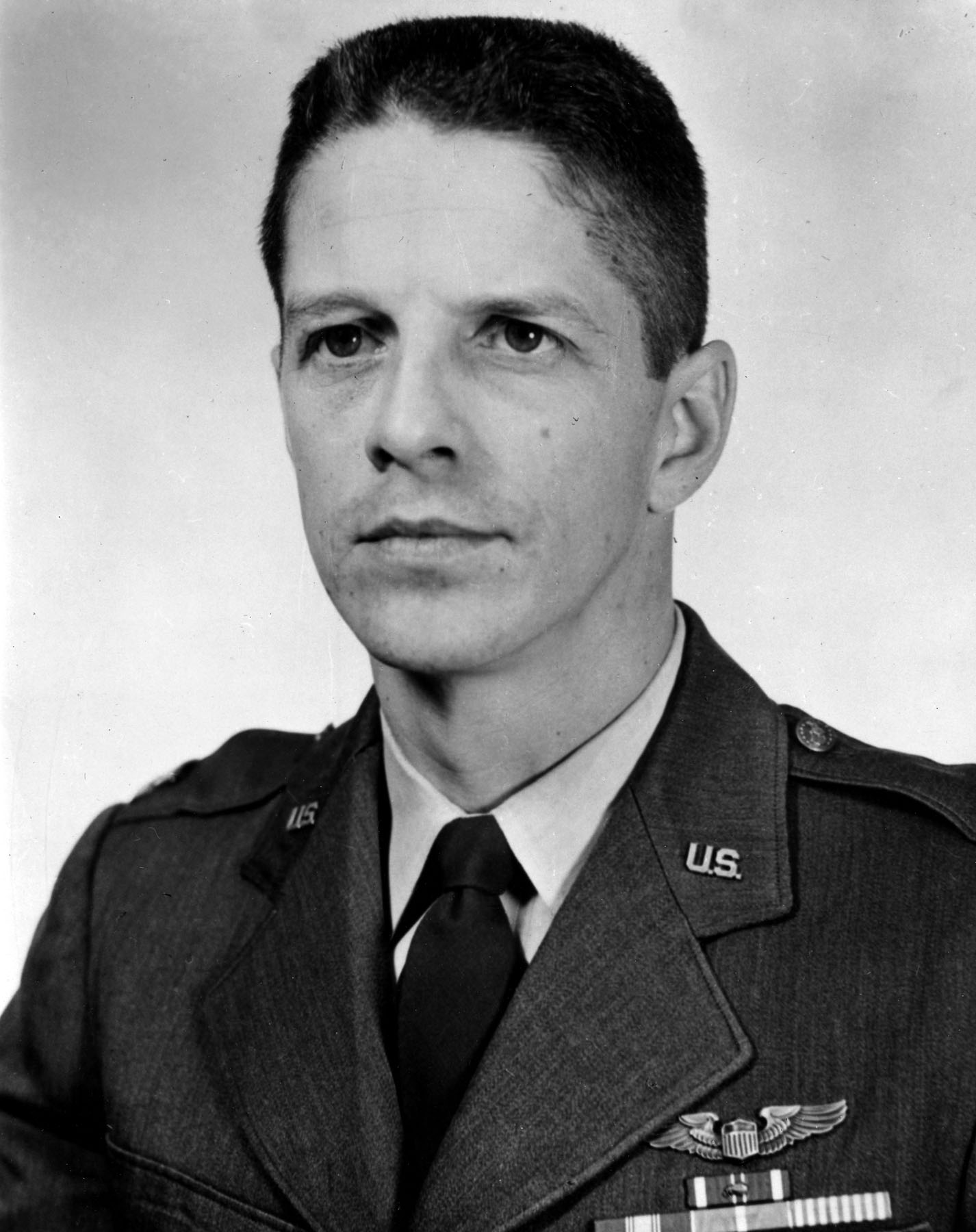
- Major Rudolf Anderson, USAF
- Born: September 15, 1927; Spartanburg, South Carolina, U.S.
- Died: October 27, 1962 (aged 35) near Banes, Cuba
- Burial place: Woodlawn Memorial Park; Greenville, South Carolina, U.S.
- Education: Clemson University, B.S. 1948
- Spouse(s): Frances Jane (Corbett) Anderson (1935–1981)
- Children: 2 sons, 1 daughter
- Military career
- Allegiance: United States of America
- Branch: United States Air Force
- Service years: 1951–1962
- Rank: Major
- Nickname: Rudy/Andy
- Units: 4028th Strategic Reconnaissance Squadron, 4080th Strategic Reconnaissance Wing, Strategic Air Command
- Conflicts: Korean War; Cuban Missile Crisis †
- Awards: Air Force Cross; Distinguished Flying Cross (3); Purple Heart; Cheney Award

Rudolf Anderson Jr. (September 15, 1927 – October 27, 1962) was an American Air Force major and pilot. He was the first recipient of the Air Force Cross, the U.S. military's and Air Force's second-highest award and decoration for valor. The only U.S. fatality by enemy fire during the Cuban Missile Crisis, Anderson was killed when his U-2 reconnaissance aircraft was shot down over Cuba. He had previously served in Korea during the Korean War.

== Early life and education ==
Anderson was born in Spartanburg, South Carolina near Greenville. He earned the rank of Eagle Scout from Boy Scout Troop 19 “America’s Troop 19” in Greenville and was a member of Recovery Lodge no. 31, Greenville's oldest Masonic Lodge. After graduating from Augusta Circle Elementary School in Greenville, he graduated from Greenville High School in 1944. In 1948, he earned a Bachelor of Science degree in Textile Engineering from Clemson University in Clemson, South Carolina as a member of Air Force ROTC Detachment 770. For the next three years, he was employed in Greenville.

== Air Force career ==
He entered the Air Force in November 1951 during the Korean War. Commissioned as a second lieutenant in 1952, Anderson completed Primary and Advanced pilot training and received his U.S. Air Force aeronautical rating as a pilot; he received his pilot wings in February 1953. He began his operational career flying RF-86 Sabres and earned two Distinguished Flying Crosses for reconnaissance missions after the war ended, when he was assigned to the 15th Tactical Reconnaissance Squadron at Kunsan Air Base in South Korea and flying missions out of Komaki Air Base in Japan. In April 1955, he returned to the United States. After qualifying on the U-2 on September 3, 1957, "he became the 4080th Strategic Reconnaissance Wing's top U-2 pilot with over one thousand hours, making him a vital part of the United States' reconnaissance operation over Cuba in late October of 1962."

=== Cuban Missile Crisis ===
Originally flown by the Central Intelligence Agency (CIA), the Lockheed U-2 high-altitude reconnaissance missions over Cuba were taken over by the Air Force on October 14, 1962, using CIA U-2 aircraft that were repainted with USAF insignia. Anderson was part of the 4028th Strategic Reconnaissance Weather Squadron, 4080th Strategic Reconnaissance Wing, headquartered at Laughlin Air Force Base, Texas. On October 15, when CIA analysts studied reconnaissance film from the first 4080th overflight, they found SS-4 medium-range ballistic missiles. These pictures triggered the Cuban Missile Crisis.

On Saturday, October 27, Anderson took off on his sixth mission over Cuba in a U-2F Dragon Lady (AF Serial Number 56-6676, former CIA Article 343), from a forward operating location at McCoy Air Force Base in Orlando, Florida. At 10:19 a.m., he was shot down over Banes, Cuba, by one of two Soviet-supplied S-75 Dvina (NATO designation SA-2 Guideline) surface-to-air missiles that were fired at his aircraft by the orders of two Soviet generals, stationed in Havana.

The missile exploded near Anderson's plane, spraying it with shrapnel. Some penetrated Anderson's helmet and pressure suit, either killing him instantly or within a few seconds due to depressurization and loss of oxygen.

On October 31, Acting United Nations Secretary-General U Thant returned from a visit with Premier Fidel Castro and announced that Anderson was dead. His body was released by Cuba on Sunday, November 4, and he was buried at Woodlawn Memorial Park in Greenville two days later.

By order of President John F. Kennedy, Anderson was posthumously awarded the first Air Force Cross, as well as the Air Force Distinguished Service Medal, the Purple Heart, and the Cheney Award. On July 26, 2011, Anderson was inducted into the Air Force Reserve Officer Training Corps Distinguished Alumni in a ceremony at Maxwell AFB, Alabama, officiated by Lieutenant General Allen G. Peck, Commander, Air University.

Anderson was the only combat death among the eleven U-2 pilots that flew over Cuba during the Cuban Missile Crisis; the other ten pilots were each awarded the Distinguished Flying Cross. Three reconnaissance-variant Boeing RB-47 Stratojets of the 55th Strategic Reconnaissance Wing crashed between September 27 and November 11, 1962, killing a total of 11 crewmembers. Seven more airmen died when a Boeing C-135B Stratolifter delivering ammunition to Naval Base Guantanamo Bay in Cuba stalled and crashed on approach on October 23.

== Wreckage ==
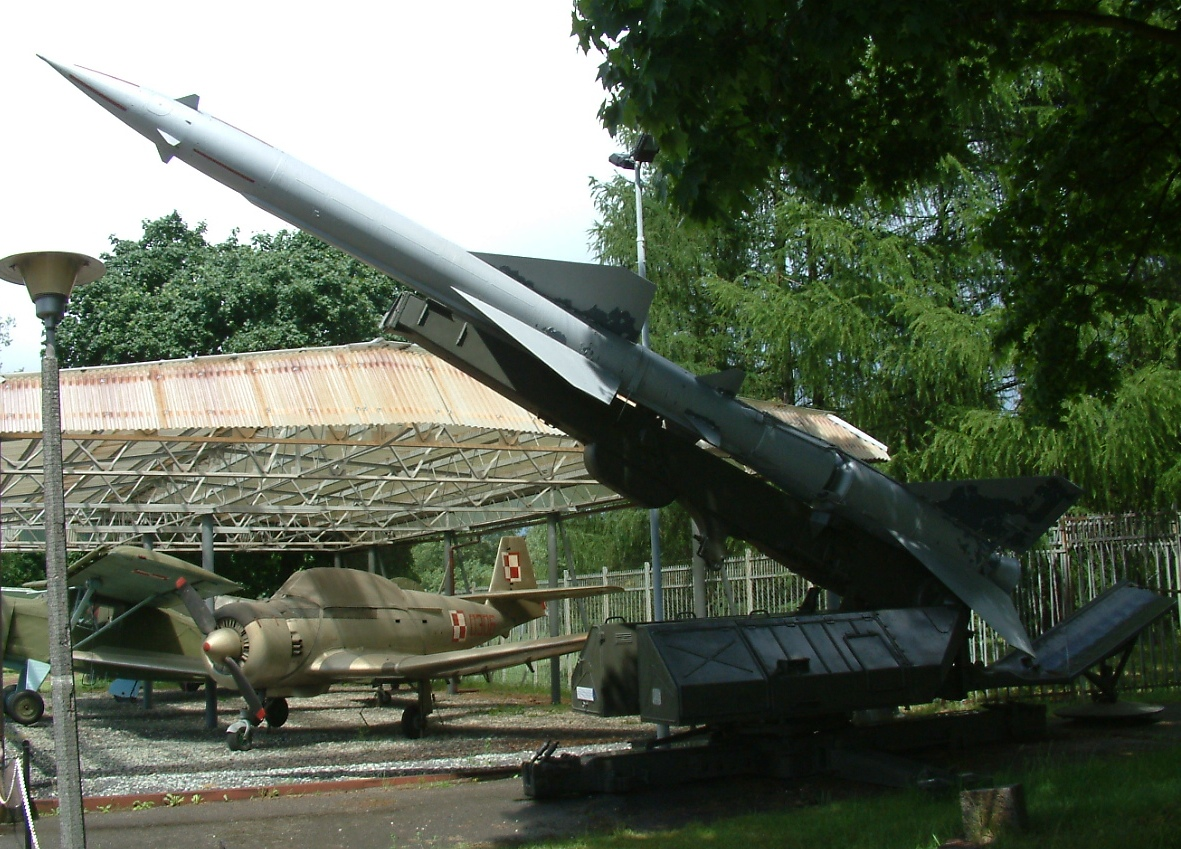
S-75 Dvina with V-750V 1D missile (NATO SA-2 Guideline) on a launcher. An installation similar to this one shot down Anderson's U-2 over Cuba.

Some of the wreckage of Major Anderson's aircraft is on display in three museums in Cuba. One of the engine intakes is at the Museo de la Lucha contra Bandidos in Trinidad. The engine and portion of the tail assembly from the U-2F is at the Museum of the Revolution in Havana. The right wing, a portion of the tail assembly, and front landing gear are at the Fortaleza de San Carlos de la Cabaña, or La Cabaña, Havana. The two latter groups of parts were previously displayed at the Museo del Aire, Havana.

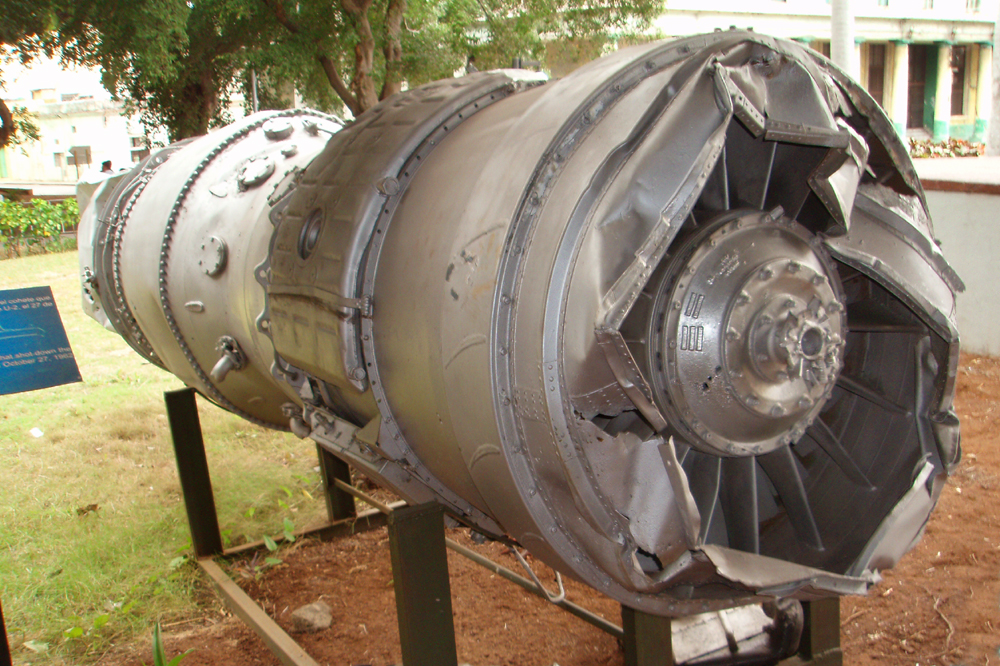
The engine of the U-2F in the Museum of the Revolution in Havana.

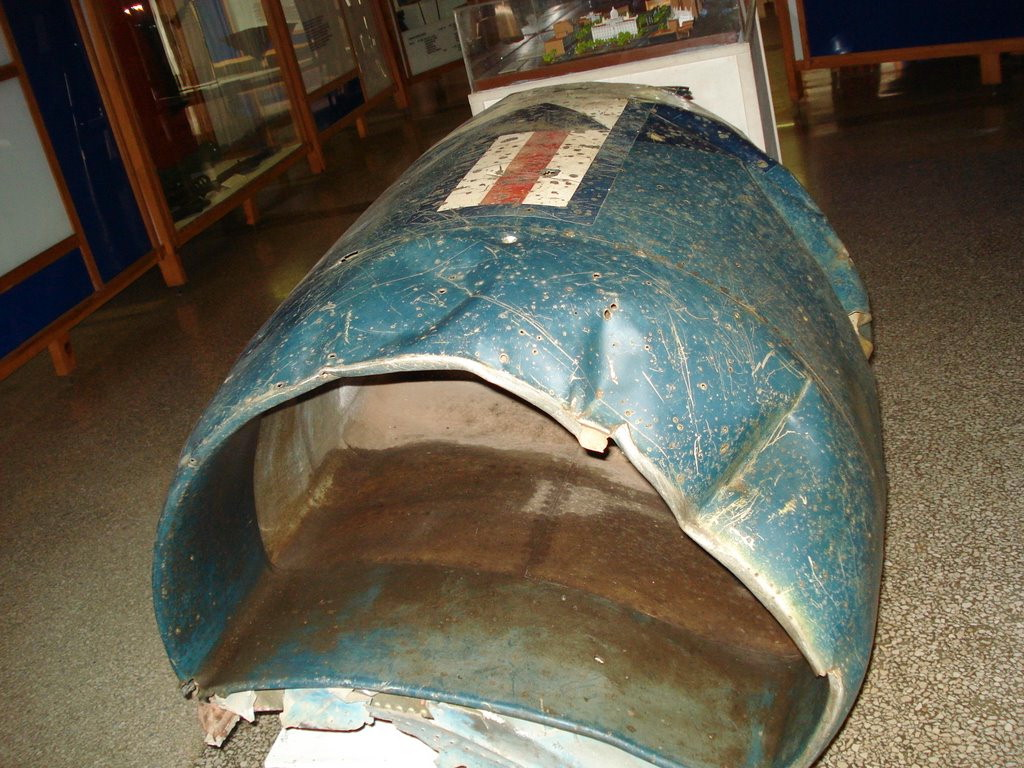
One of the engine air intakes of the U-2F in the Museo de la Lucha contra los Bandidos in Trinidad.

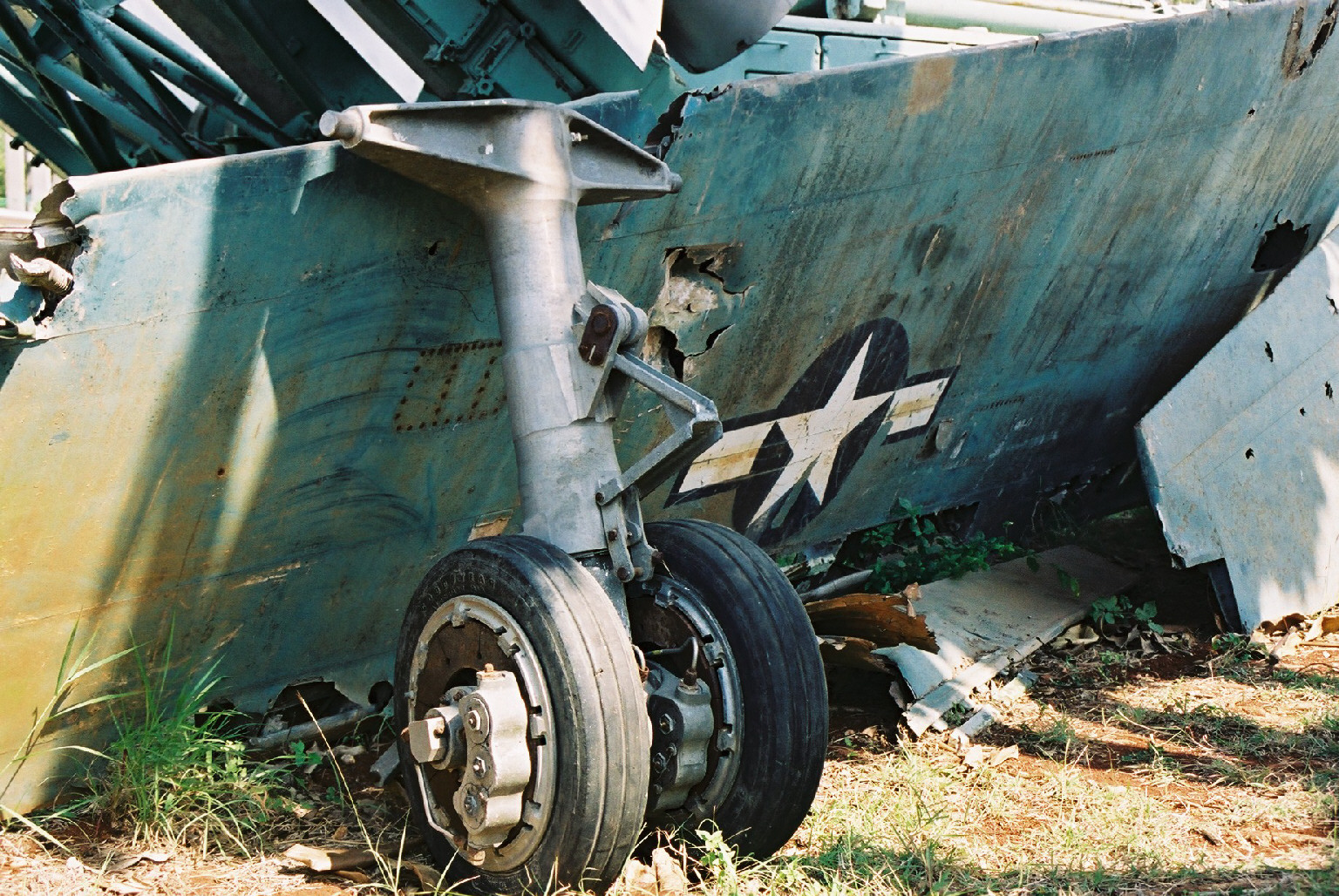
The underside of the right wing showing the U.S. national insignia, a portion of the tail assembly (right side of photo) and the front landing gear.

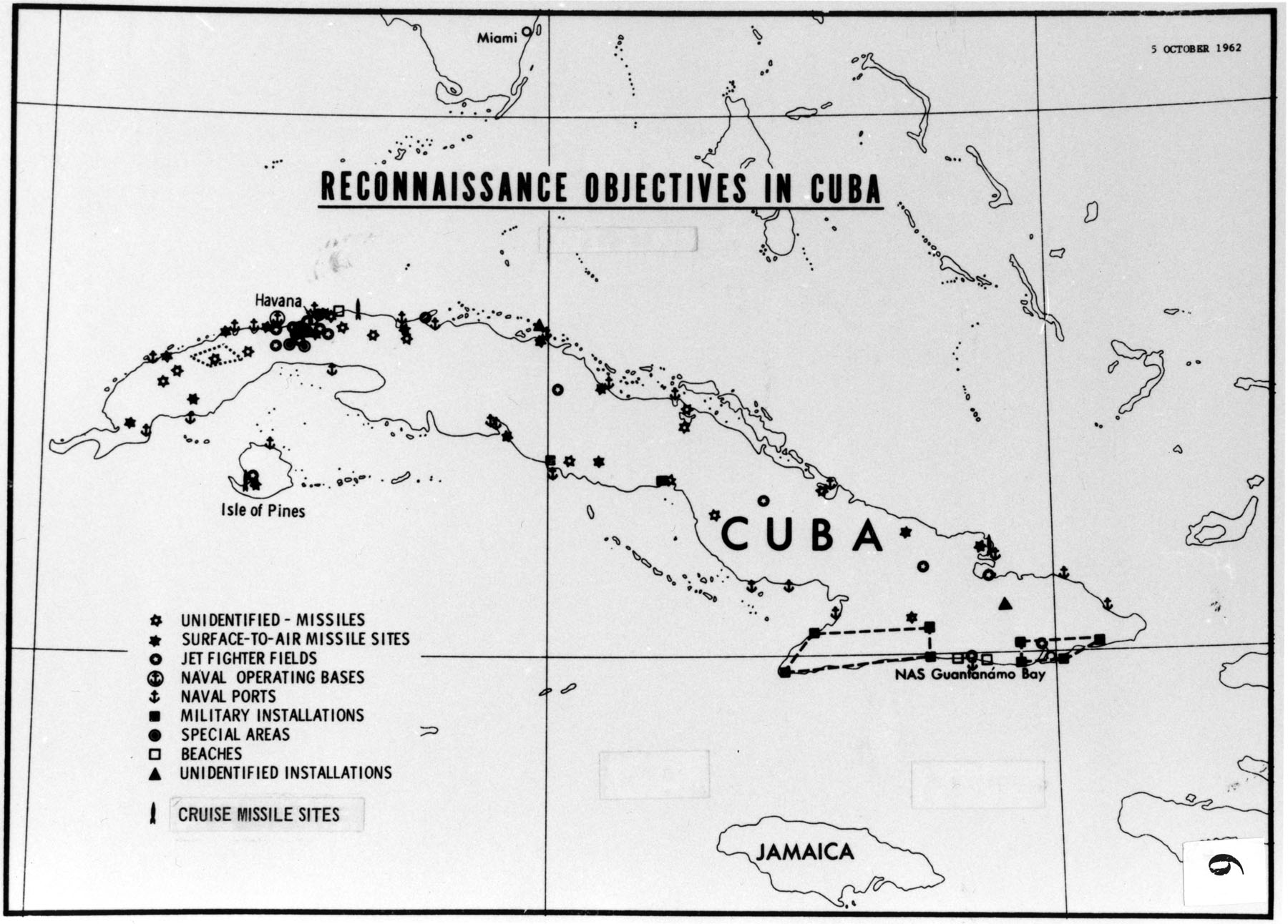
Reconnaissance objectives in Cuba, 1962.

== Military awards ==
Anderson's military awards and decorations are as follows:

Senior Pilot Badge
Air Force Cross
Air Force Distinguished Service Medal	Distinguished Flying Cross with 2 oak leaf clusters	Purple Heart
Air Medal with 1 oak leaf cluster	Presidential Unit Citation	National Defense Service Medal with 1 bronze star
Korean Service Medal with 1 bronze star	Armed Forces Expeditionary Medal	Air Force Longevity Service Award with 1 oak leaf cluster
Republic of Korea Presidential Unit Citation	United Nations Service Medal	Republic of Korea War Service Medal

=== Air Force Cross citation ===

The President of the United States of America takes pride in presenting the Air Force Cross (Posthumously) to Rudolf Anderson, Major, United States Air Force, for extraordinary heroism in connection with military operations against an armed enemy while serving with the 4080th Strategic Reconnaissance Wing, Strategic Air Command (SAC), from 15 October 1962 to 27 October 1962. During this period of great national crisis, Major Anderson, flying an unescorted, unarmed aircraft, lost his life while participating in one of several aerial reconnaissance missions over Cuba. While executing these aerial missions, Major Anderson made photographs which provided the United States government with conclusive evidence of the introduction of long-range offensive missiles into Cuba and which materially assisted our leaders in charting the nation's military and diplomatic course. Through his extraordinary heroism, superb airmanship, and aggressiveness in the face of the enemy, Major Anderson reflected the highest credit upon himself and the United States Air Force.

== Other awards, namings, memorials and recognitions ==
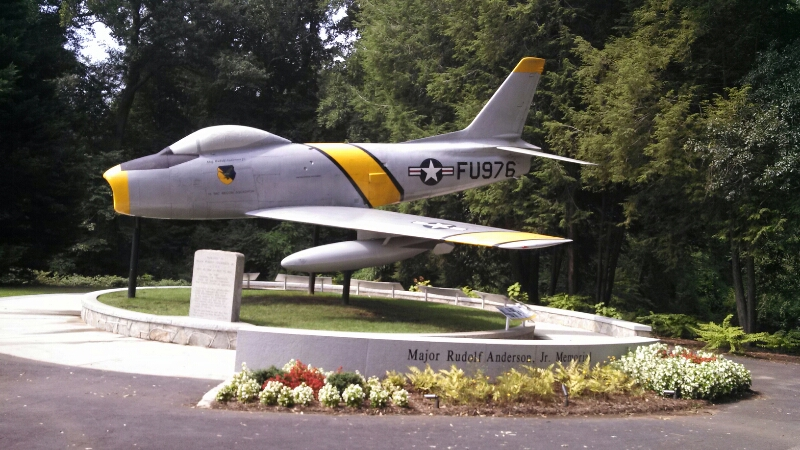
Memorial in Greenville, SC.

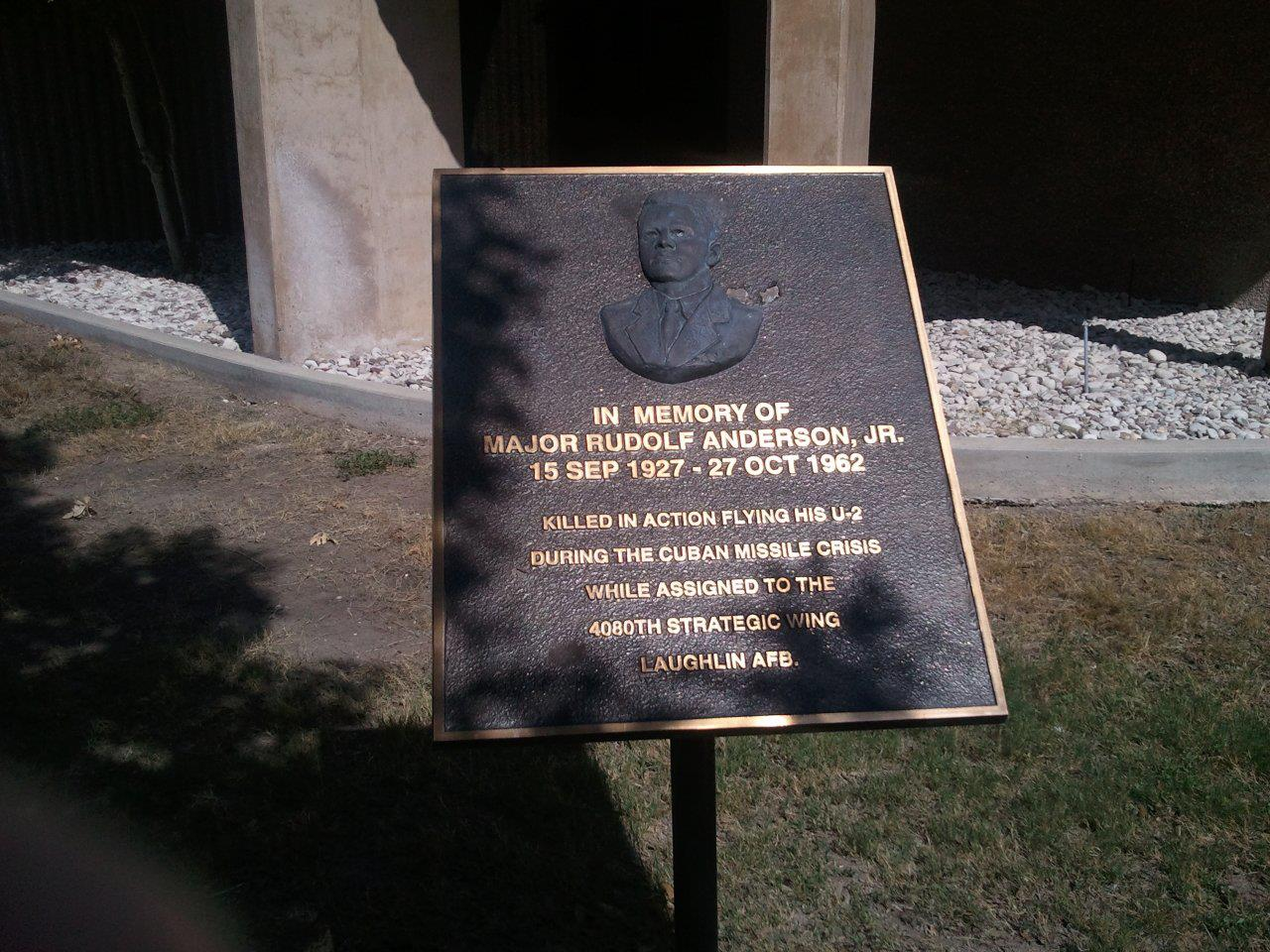
Plaque at Laughlin AFB, Texas.

Anderson's other recognitions:

- Cheney Award, 1962
- Anderson Elementary School at Eielson Air Force Base near Fairbanks, Alaska was named for him in 1964.
- The Maj. Rudolf Anderson Jr. Squadron of the Arnold Air Society at Clemson University was named in his honor.
- American Legion Post 214 in Greenville, South Carolina, was named after him in 2015.
- A memorial to Anderson was erected and dedicated to him in 1963 at Cleveland Park in Greenville. No surplus U-2 aircraft were available at the time, so an F-86 Sabre like the ones he flew in Korea was used instead: North American YF-86H-1-NA Sabre, AF Ser. No. 52-1976. The memorial was redesigned, and it was rededicated on October 27, 2012, the 50th anniversary of Anderson's death.
- The building for the 47th Operations Group at Laughlin AFB, Texas, was renamed "Anderson Hall" in 2001.
- Anderson was inducted in the South Carolina Aviation Hall of Fame in 2008.
- Anderson was inducted into the Greenville County Schools Hall of Fame in 2019.

== Popular culture ==
The shooting down of Anderson's U-2 reconnaissance flight over Cuba is featured in the 2000 film Thirteen Days starring Kevin Costner; actor Charles Esten plays the role of Anderson.

== See also ==
- 1960 U-2 incident
- Francis Gary Powers
