= 349th Air Refueling Squadron =

US Air Force unit

349th Air Refueling Squadron

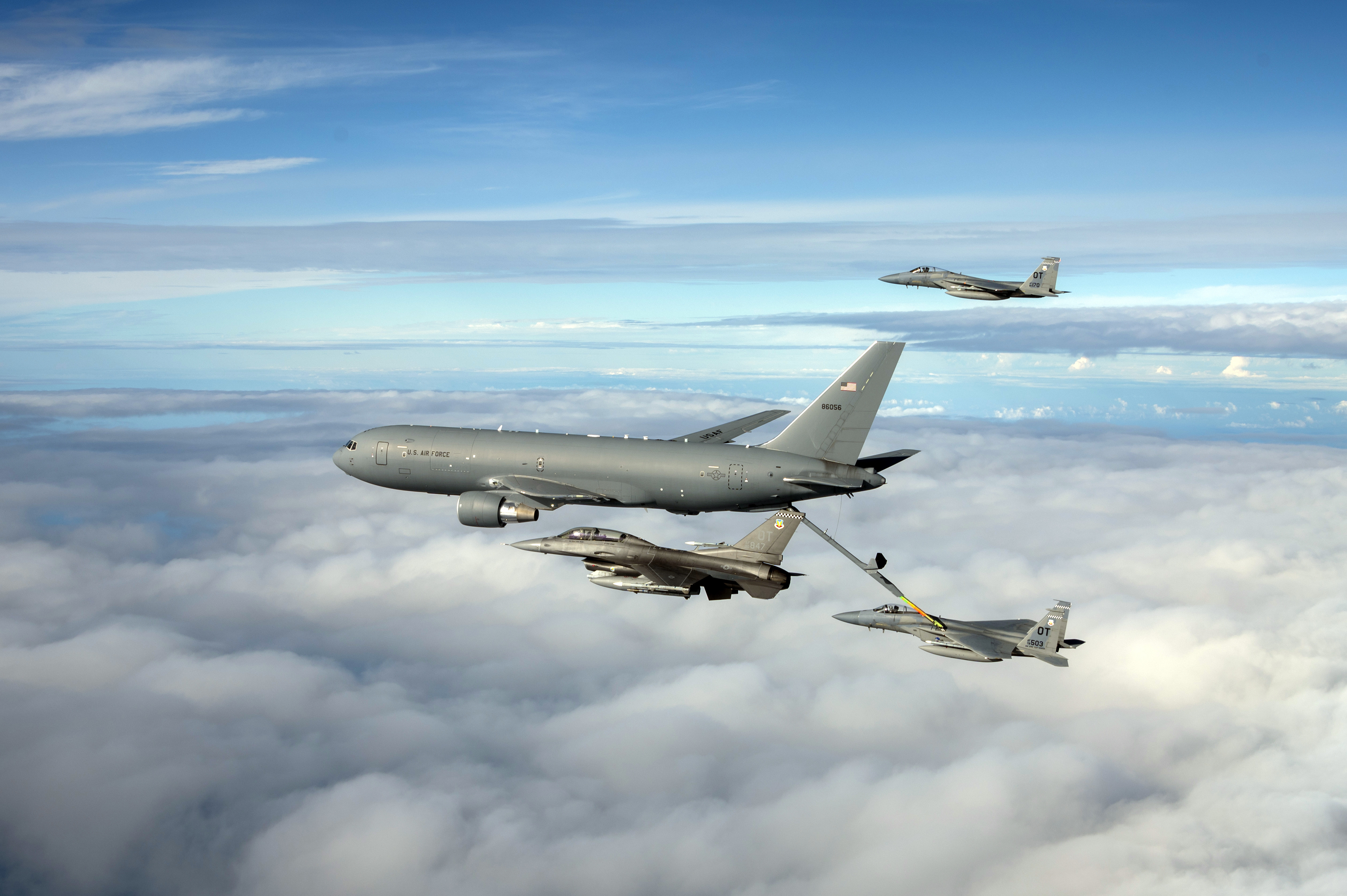
- A McConnell KC-46 Pegasus refuels an F-15C Eagle while an F-16 Fighting Falcon and F-15C fly alongside
- Active: 1942–1945; 1947–1949; 1956–1992; 1994–present
- Country: United States
- Branch: United States Air Force
- Role: Aerial refueling
- Part of: Air Mobility Command
- Garrison/HQ: McConnell Air Force Base
- Nickname: Blue Knights (1957–1977)
- Engagements: European Theater of Operations
- Decorations: Distinguished Unit Citation; Air Force Meritorious Unit Award; Air Force Outstanding Unit Award with Combat "V" Device; Air Force Outstanding Unit Award; French Croix de Guerre with Palm

Insignia
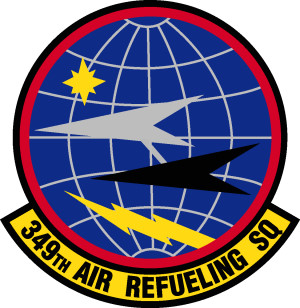
- 349th Air Refueling Squadron emblem (Note: Approved 11 January 1977. Description: On a Blue globe gridlined Gray enveloped by a Red band all within a narrow Black border, two aerodynamic symbols in horizontal flight, engaged in air refueling, the topmost symbol and connector Gray, the lower symbol Black all between a Yellow sunburst in the top of the disc to dexter, and a Yellow lightning bolt issuing from base in sinister.)

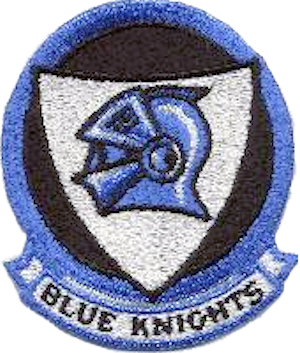
- Patch with 349th Bombardment Squadron emblem (Note: Approved 24 May 1957. Description: A black disc bordered blue, over all a white shield edged black, charged with a knight's head in profile, wearing an open visored helmet, blue, highlights white, outlines and shadows black.)

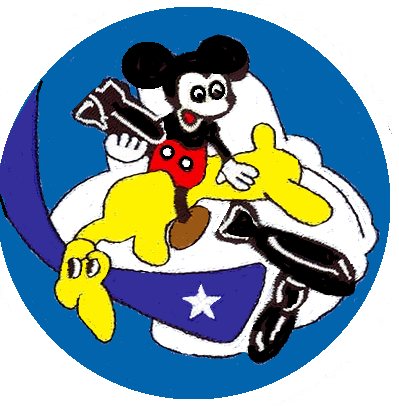
- 349th Bombardment Squadron emblem (World War II)

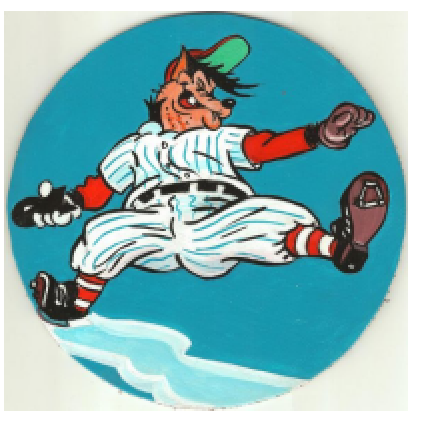
- Early World War II emblem (Note: This emblem is identified as designed for the squadron. but it is not clear whether it was used before the one showing Mickey Mouse and Pluto was adopted.)
- World War II fuselage code: XR

The 349th Air Refueling Squadron is a unit of the US Air Force, part of the 22nd Air Refueling Wing at McConnell Air Force Base, Kansas. It operates the Boeing KC-135 Stratotanker aircraft conducting aerial refueling missions.

The squadron, was activated as the 349th Bombardment Squadron during World War II as a heavy bomber unit. It served in combat in the European Theater of Operations, where it earned a Distinguished Unit Citation and the French Croix de Guerre with Palm for its actions. After V-E Day the squadron returned to the United States and was inactivated at the port of embarkation.

The squadron was briefly active in the reserve from 1947 to 1949, but does not appear to have been fully equipped or manned.

It was activated in 1956 with Strategic Air Command as a medium bomber unit and stood alert at Pease Air Force Base until late 1965 with Boeing B-47 Stratojets. In 1966 it moved to Davis-Monthan Air Force Base, where, as the 349th Strategic Reconnaissance Squadron, it flew worldwide reconnaissance missions. In 1976, it became an air refueling squadron. Through 1990, it flew specially modified Boeing KC-135 Stratotankers to refuel Lockheed SR-71 Blackbirds. The squadron converted to Boeing KC-46 Pegasus in 2022.

== History ==
=== World War II ===
==== Training in the United States ====
The squadron was activated as the 349th Bombardment Squadron at Orlando Army Air Base, Florida on 1 June 1942, one of the four original squadrons of the 100th Bombardment Group, It was intended to be equipped with Consolidated B-24 Liberators. The Army Air Forces (AAF) decided to concentrate heavy bomber training under Second Air Force, and before the end of June, the squadron moved to Pendleton Field, Oregon, and its intended equipment changed to Boeing B-17 Flying Fortresses. As a result, the squadron only began organizing in October 1942, after it had moved to Gowen Field, Idaho. The following month, it moved to Walla Walla Army Air Field, Washington, where it received its first operational aircraft and began training.

The 349th completed its training and departed Kearney Army Air Field, Nebraska for the European Theater of Operations on 1 May 1943. The ground echelon sailed on the RMS Queen Elizabeth on 28 May, arriving at Greenock, Scotland on 3 June, while the air echelon engaged in additional training before departing via the northern ferry route to England about 21 May 1943.

==== Combat in Europe ====
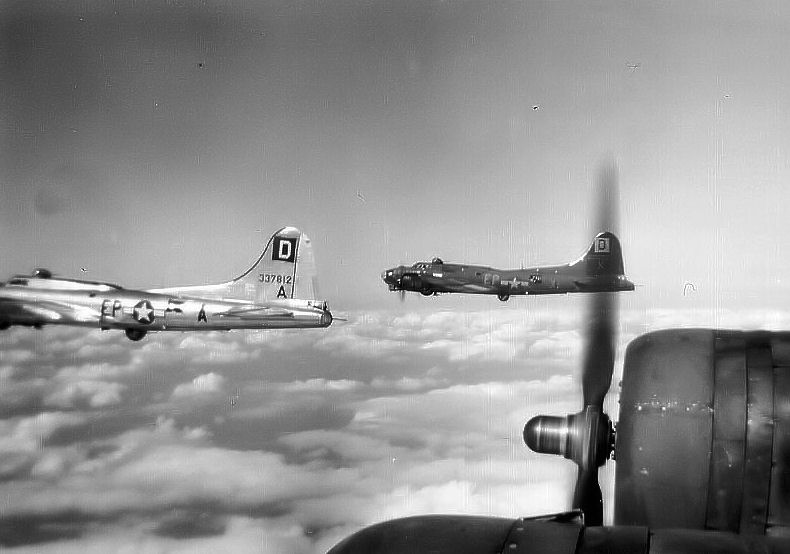
100th Bombardment Group B-17s on a combat mission

The squadron established itself at its combat station, RAF Thorpe Abbotts, on 9 June 1943, flying its first combat mission on 25 June. Until the end of the war, the squadron was primarily employed in the strategic bombing campaign against Germany. Until January 1944, it concentrated its operations on airfields in France, and industrial targets and naval facilities in France and Germany. On 17 August 1943, it participated in an attack on a factory manufacturing Messerschmitt Bf 109 fighters in Regensburg, Germany, which seriously disrupted production of that plane. Although the mission called for fighter escort, the fighter group assigned to protect the squadron's formation missed the rendezvous and the wing formation proceeded to the target unescorted. Enemy fighter opposition focused on the low "box", formed in part by the squadron. Ten of the 21 Flying Fortresses flown by the 100th Group were lost on this mission. Unknown to AAF intelligence at the time, the attack also destroyed almost all of the fuselage construction equipment for Germany's secret Me 262 jet fighter. Rather than returning to England, the unit turned south and recovered at bases in North Africa. For this action, the squadron was awarded the Distinguished Unit Citation (DUC).

From January to May 1944, the 349th attacked airfields, industrial targets, marshalling yards, and missile sites in Western Europe. During Big Week, it participated in the concentrated attack on the German aircraft industry. In March, it conducted a series of long range attacks against Berlin, for which it was awarded a second DUC. The raid of 6 March was to be the costliest mission flown by Eighth Air Force during the war. German fighter controllers detected that the formation including the squadron was unprotected by fighter escorts and concentrated interceptor attacks on it. Twenty-three B-17s from the formation failed to return. (Note: In addition to the squadrons of the 100th Group, the formation included those of the 95th Bombardment Group.) Two days later, German fighters shot down the leader of the 45th Combat Bombardment Wing, and the 100th Group took the lead in another attack on Berlin. From the summer of 1944, the 349th concentrated on German oil production facilities.

The squadron was occasionally diverted from strategic bombing to perform interdiction and air support missions. It attacked bridges and gun positions to support Operation Overlord, the landings at Normandy in June 1944. In August and September it supported Operation Cobra, the breakout at Saint Lo, and bombed enemy positions in Brest. As Allied forces drove across Northern France toward the Siegfried Line in October and November, it attacked transportation and ground defenses. During the Battle of the Bulge in December 1944 and January 1945, it attacked lines of communication and fortified villages in the Ardennes. It provided support for Operation Varsity, the airborne assault across the Rhine in March 1945. The squadron was awarded the French Croix de Guerre with Palm for attacks on heavily defended sites and dropping supplies to the French Forces of the Interior.

The squadron flew its last mission on 20 April 1945. Following, V-E Day, the squadron was initially programmed to be part of the occupation forces in Germany, but that plan was cancelled in September, and between October and December, the squadron's planes were ferried back to the United States or transferred to other units in theater. Its remaining personnel returned to the United States in December and the squadron was inactivated at the Port of Embarkation on 19 December 1945.

==== "Bloody Hundredth" ====
Starting with the Regensburg mission of August 1943, the squadrons of the 100th Bombardment Group began suffering losses among the highest in VIII Bomber Command. On 8 October, it lost seven aircraft on a raid on Bremen, including its lead and deputy lead aircraft. Only two days later, it lost twelve aircraft on an attack on Münster, again including the lead aircraft. The only group plane returning from that mission had lost two engines and had two wounded on board. (Note: This plane, named Rosie's Riveter, was lost in the spring of 1945, but its crew was able to bail out in Russian held territory.) Its highest one day loss occurred on the 6 March 1944 attack on Berlin, when 15 bombers failed to return. On 11 September 1944, the Luftwaffe put up its heaviest opposition in months, destroying 11 of the group's bombers. On 31 December 1944, half the 1st Bombardment Division's losses consisted of a dozen 100th bombers. With a group authorization of 40 B-17s, it lost 177 planes to enemy action. It became a legend for these losses and was referred to as the "Bloody Hundredth."

=== Air Force reserve ===
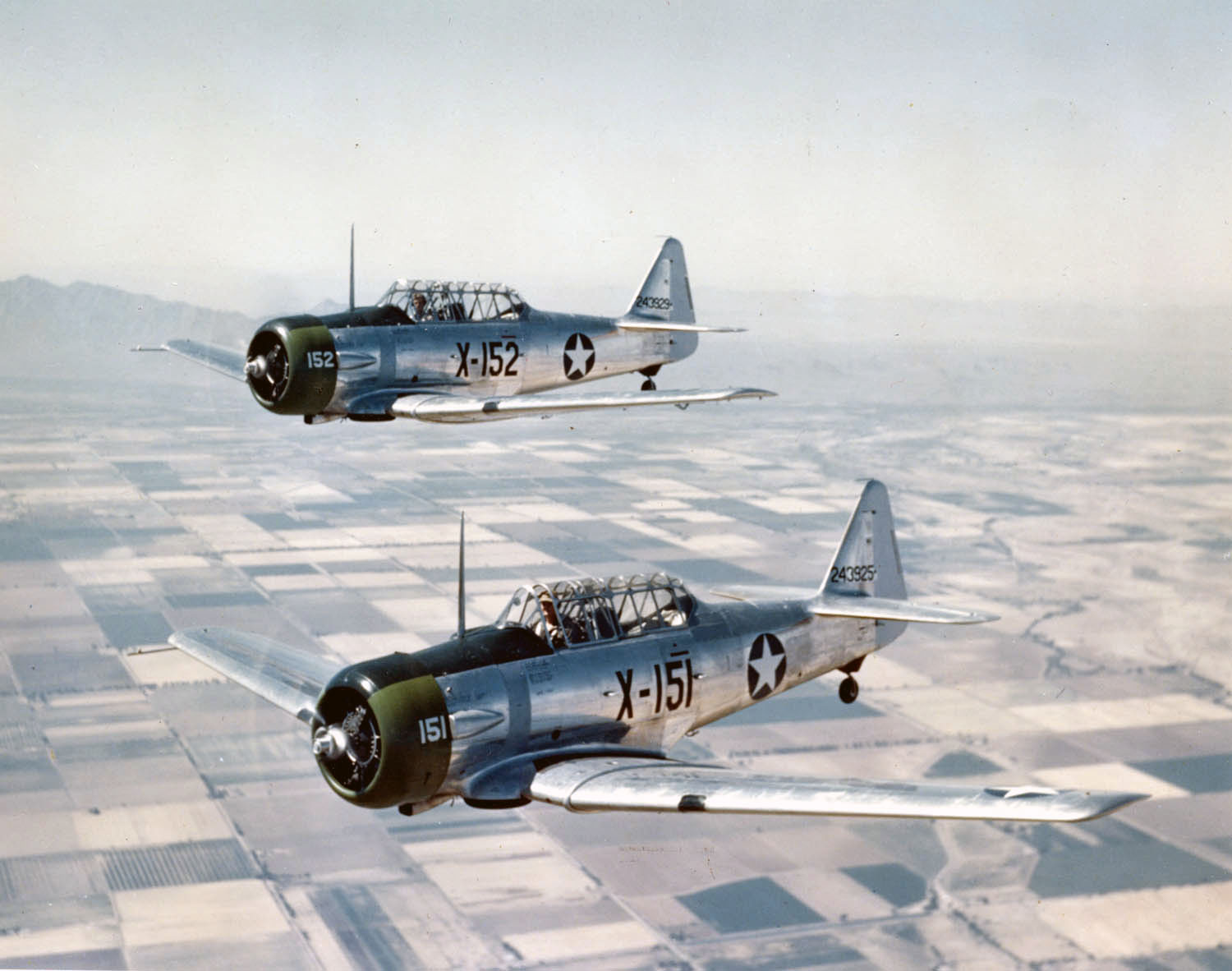
T-6 Texans as flown by the squadron in the reserve

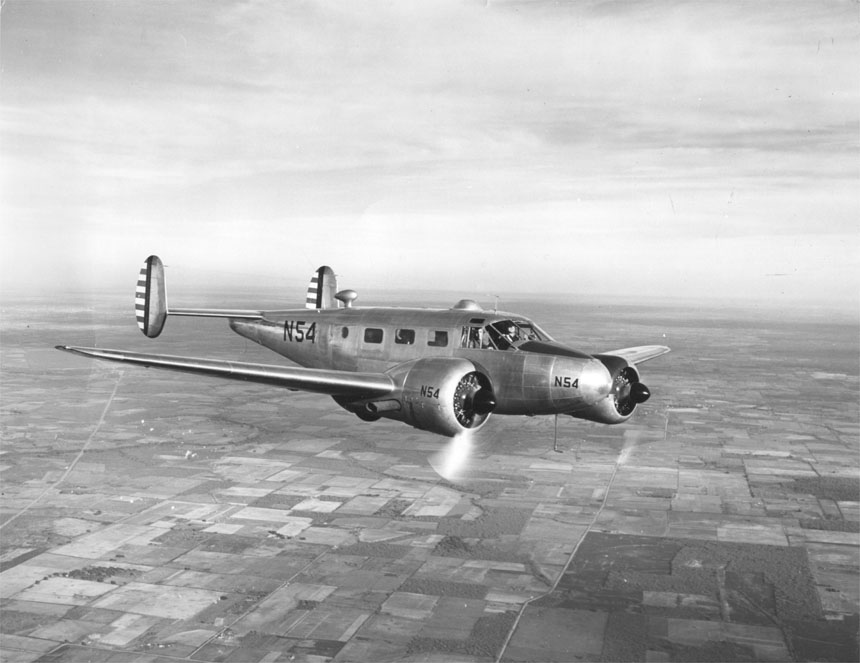
A Beechcraft AT-7as flown by the squadron in the reserve

The squadron was activated under Air Defense Command (ADC) in the reserve at Miami Army Air Field, Florida and was again assigned to the 100th Group on 29 May 1947. There, its training was supervised by the 473d AAF Base Unit (later the 2585th Air Force Reserve Training Center) of ADC. As the post war Air Force took shape, the National Guard was considered the first line of reserve. Reserve units like the 349th got what was left over after National Guard units received facilities, equipment and aircraft. Aircraft were allotted to reserve units as a means of maintaining flying proficiency, not combat readiness. Aircraft assigned to the reserves were overwhelmingly trainers, and no heavy bombers were ever assigned. The allotment of units to the reserves was made only for planning purposes and mobilization plans called for personnel assigned to the 349th to be called to active duty during mobilization as individuals, not as a unit.

In 1948 Continental Air Command (ConAC) assumed responsibility for managing reserve and Air National Guard units from ADC. The 349th was inactivated when ConAC reorganized its reserve units under the wing base organization system in June 1949. The squadron was inactivated, and its personnel and equipment, along with that of other reserve units at Miami were transferred to elements of the 435th Troop Carrier Wing.

=== Strategic Air Command ===
==== Strategic bombardment ====
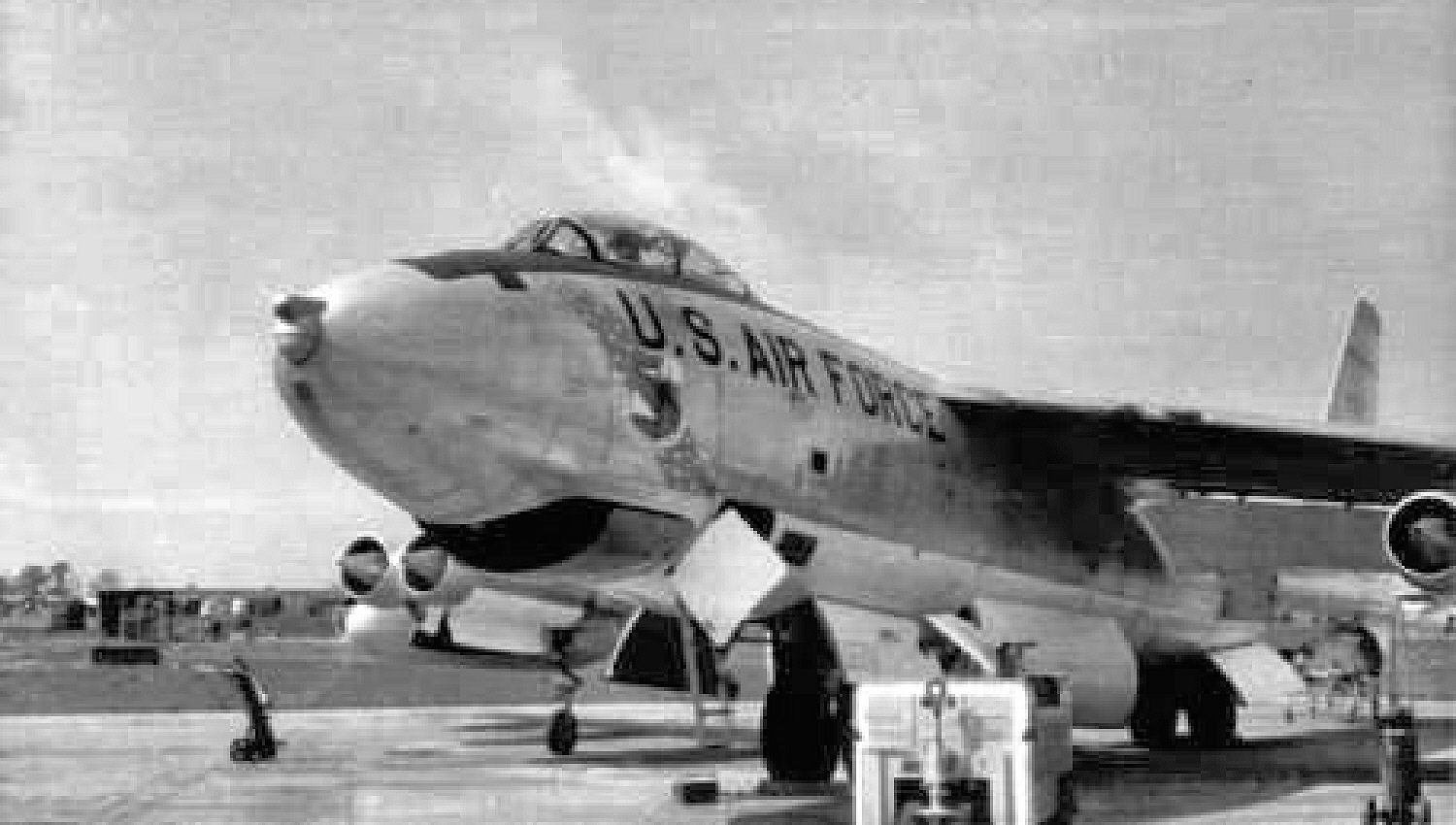
100th Wing B47 parked at a dispersal base

The squadron was activated at the start of 1956 as Strategic Air Command (SAC) opened Portsmouth Air Force Base. It began to equip with Boeing B-47 Stratojets. From December 1957 until April 1958, it deployed to RAF Brize Norton, along with the rest of the 100th Bombardment Wing. Starting in 1958, the squadron began to assume an alert posture at its home station, now Pease Air Force Base, reducing the amount of time spent on alert at overseas bases. General Thomas S. Power had set an initial goal of maintaining one third of SAC's planes on fifteen minute ground alert, fully fueled and ready for combat to reduce vulnerability to a Soviet missile strike. This was increased to half the squadron's aircraft in 1962.

Soon after detection of Soviet missiles in Cuba, all degraded and adjusted alert sorties were brought up to full capability. SAC B-47s dispersed on 22 October. Most dispersal bases were civilian airfields with AF Reserve or Air National Guard units. B-47s were configured for execution of the Emergency War Order as soon as possible after dispersal. KC-97s were dispersed to Goose Air Base, Lajes Air Base and Harmon Air Force Base to provide refueling for the B-47s on increased alert status. On 15 November 1/6 of the dispersed B-47s were recalled to their home bases. On 21 November SAC went to DEFCON 3. The squadron's B-47s were recalled to Pease on 24 November. On 27 November SAC returned to normal alert posture.

The squadron continued operations until the end of 1965. when it began to phase down with the retirement of the B-47 from SAC. The squadron ceased all operations on 12 February 1966.

==== Strategic reconnaissance ====
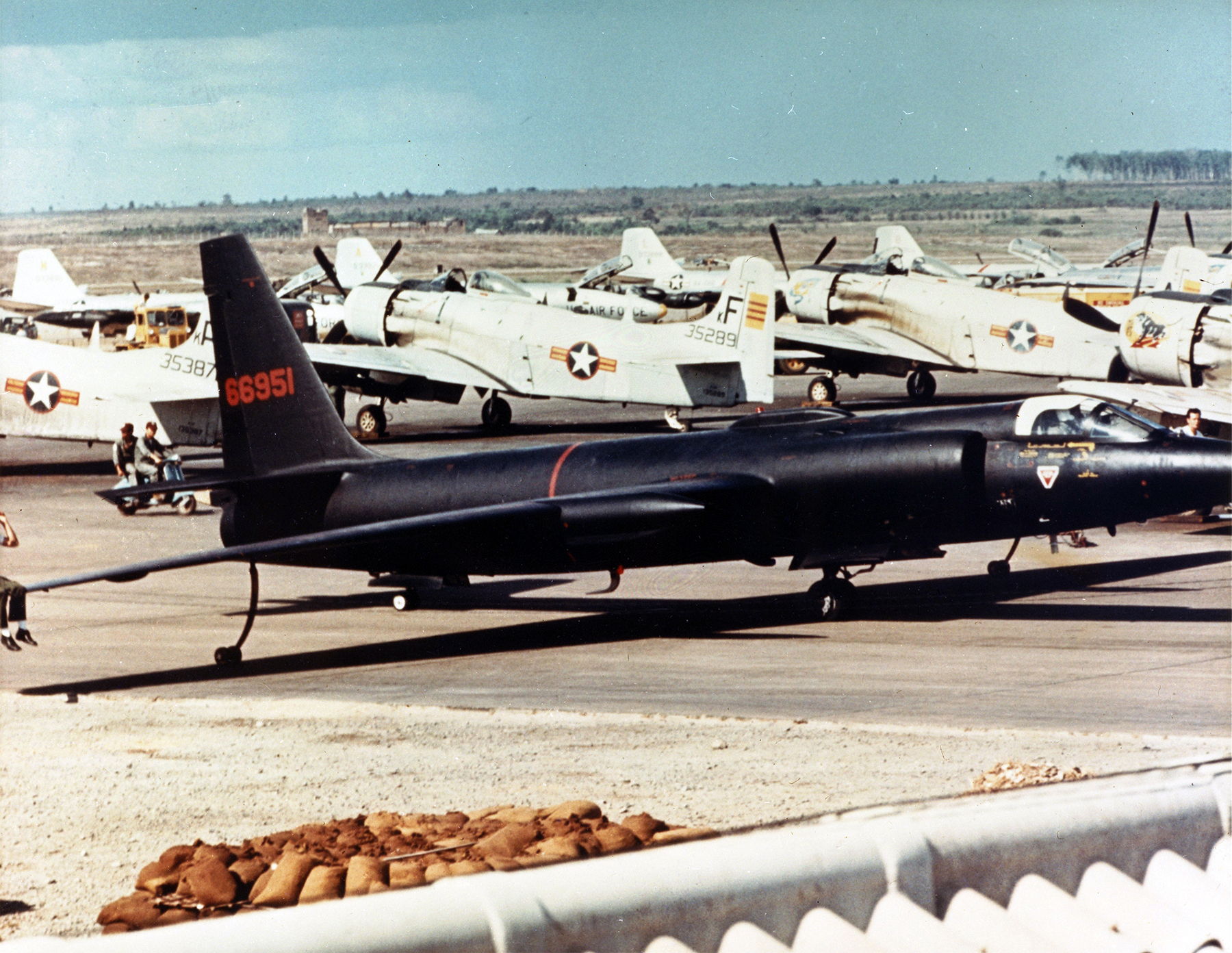
Lockheed U-2 deployed to Vietnam (Note: This plane crashed at Davis Monthan on 17 October 1966 while practicing landings.)

On 25 June 1966, the squadron moved without personnel or equipment to Davis-Monthan Air Force Base, where it was redesignated the 349th Strategic Reconnaissance Squadron and absorbed the personnel and Lockheed U-2 aircraft of the 4028th Strategic Reconnaissance Squadron, which was simultaneously discontinued. The squadron conducted global reconnaissance missions, often providing aircraft to overseas operating locations of its parent 100th Strategic Reconnaissance Wing. It also flew domestic reconnaissance missions supporting US government agencies. Starting in 1972, it conducted operational trials of the Advanced Location and Strike System, and deployed five U-2Cs to the United Kingdom for this purpose in 1975.

The squadron began transferring its U-2s to the 9th Strategic Reconnaissance Wing at Beale Air Force Base in July 1976. By 11 August, it had once again become nonoperational.

=== Air Refueling ===
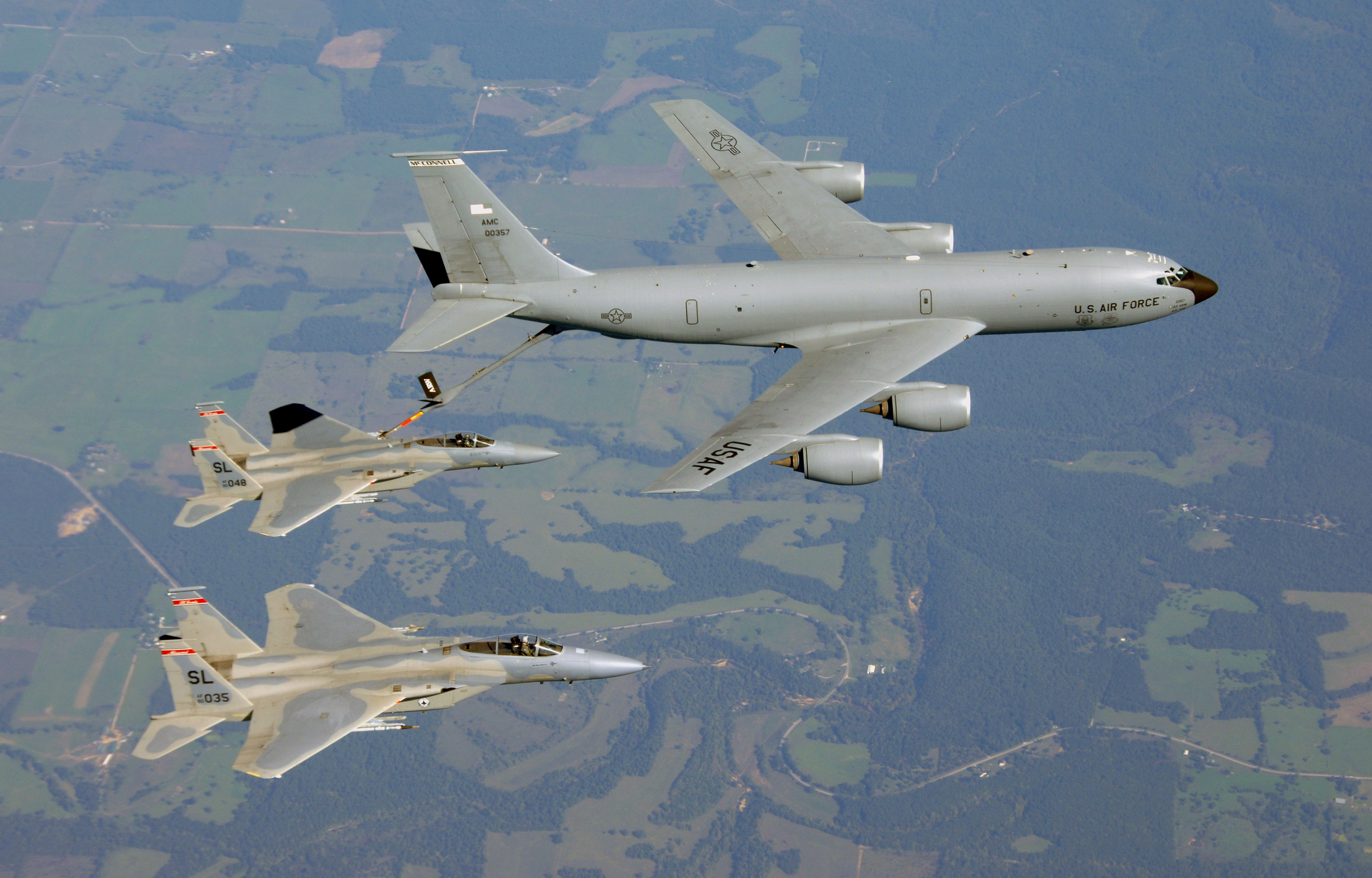
A 22nd Air Refueling Wing Boeing KC-135R refueling Missouri ANG F-15Cs

Once again the squadron made a transfer on paper, when, on 30 September 1976, it moved to Beale Air Force Base, where it absorbed the personnel and specially modified Boeing KC-135Q Stratotankers of the 903d Air Refueling Squadron, which was simultaneously inactivated. The 349th took over the 903rd's mission of refueling the Lockheed SR-71 Blackbird until the Blackbird was retired in 1990.

In March 1983, the 100th Air Refueling Wing was inactivated and the squadron was reassigned to the 9th Strategic Reconnaissance Wing.

During Operation Desert Storm, the squadron provided cargo and aerial refueling support to combat units in Southwest Asia from August 1990 through March 1991. In September 1991, SAC implemented the Objective Wing reorganization and the squadron became part of the reactivated 9th Operations Group. The squadron was inactivated on 1 June 1992.

In January 2022, the squadron began its transition from the KC-135 to the Boeing KC-46 Pegasus. For the eighteen months of the transition, the squadron would fly both aircraft, although the KC-46 became its primary aircraft by October 2022. While transitioning, the squadron performed the first refueling of a CV-22 Osprey by a KV-46.

== Lineage ==
- Constituted as the 349th Bombardment Squadron (Heavy) on 28 January 1942

Activated on 1 June 1942
Redesignated 349th Bombardment Squadron, Heavy on 20 August 1943
Inactivated on 1 December 1945
Redesignated 349th Bombardment Squadron, Very Heavy on 13 May 1947
Activated in the reserve on 29 May 1947
Inactivated on 27 June 1949
Redesignated 349th Bombardment Squadron, Medium on 1 August 1955
Activated on 1 January 1956
Redesignated 349th Strategic Reconnaissance Squadron on 25 June 1966
Redesignated 349th Air Refueling Squadron, Heavy on 30 September 1976
Redesignated 349th Air Refueling Squadron on 1 September 1991
Inactivated on 1 June 1992
Activated on 1 January 1994

=== Assignments ===
- 100th Bombardment Group, 1 June 1942 – 1 December 1945
- 100th Bombardment Group, 29 May 1947 – 27 June 1949
- 100th Bombardment Wing (later 100th Strategic Reconnaissance Wing, 100th Air Refueling Wing), 1 January 1956
- 9th Strategic Reconnaissance Wing, 15 March 1983
- 9th Operations Group, 1 September 1991 – 1 June 1992
- 22nd Operations Group, 1 January 1994 – present

=== Stations ===
- Orlando Army Air Base, Florida 1 June 1942
- Barksdale Field, Louisiana, c. 18 June 1942
- Pendleton Field, Oregon c. 26 June 1942
- Gowen Field, Idaho, 28 August 1942
- Walla Walla Army Air Field, Washington, c. 1 November 1942
- Wendover Field, Utah, c. 30 November 1942
- Sioux City Army Air Base, Iowa, c. 28 December 1942
- Kearney Army Air Field, Nebraska, c. 30 January – May 1943
- RAF Thorpe Abbotts (AAF Station 139), England, 9 June 1943 – December 1945
- Camp Kilmer, New Jersey, c. 20–21 December 1945
- Miami Army Air Field (later Miami International Airport), Florida (1947–1949)
- Portsmouth Air Force Base (later Pease Air Force Base), New Hampshire, 1 January 1956 – 30 April 1966 (deployed to RAF Brize Norton, England 4 January–1 April 1958)
- Davis–Monthan Air Force Base, Arizona, 25 June 1966 – 1 July 1976
- Beale Air Force Base, California, 25 January 1982
- McConnell Air Force Base, Kansas, 1 January 1994 – present)

=== Aircraft ===
- Boeing B-17 Flying Fortress (1942–1945)
- North American AT-6 Texan (1947–1949)
- Beechcraft AT-7 Navigator (1947–1949)
- Beechcraft AT-11 Kansan (1947–1949)
- Boeing B-47 Stratojet (1956–1966)
- Lockheed U-2 (1966–1976)
- Lockheed WU-2 (1966–1976)
- Boeing KC-135 Stratotanker (1976–1992, 1994–2023)
- Boeing KC-46 Pegasus (2022–present)

=== Awards and campaigns ===
Award streamer	Award	Dates	Notes
	Distinguished Unit Citation	17 August 1943	Germany, 349th Bombardment Squadron
	Distinguished Unit Citation	4, 6, 8 March 1944	Berlin, Germany, 349th Bombardment Squadron
	Air Force Meritorious Unit Award	1 August 2011–31 July 2012	Air Refueling Squadron
	Air Force Meritorious Unit Award	1 August 2012–31 July 2013	349th Air Refueling Squadron
	Air Force Meritorious Unit Award	1 August 2013–31 July 2014	349th Air Refueling Squadron
	Air Force Meritorious Unit Award	1 August 2017–31 July 2018	349th Air Refueling Squadron
	Air Force Meritorious Unit Award	1 August 2018–31 July 2020	349th Air Refueling Squadron
	Air Force Meritorious Unit Award	1 August 2021–31 July 2022	349th Air Refueling Squadron
	Air Force Outstanding Unit Award with Combat "V" Device	1 July 1972–30 June 1973	349th Strategic Reconnaissance Squadron
	Air Force Outstanding Unit Award	1 July 1983–30 June 1984	349th Strategic Reconnaissance Squadron
	Air Force Outstanding Unit Award	1 July 1985–30 June 1986	349th Air Refueling Squadron
	Air Force Outstanding Unit Award	1 July 1986–30 June 1987	349th Air Refueling Squadron
	Air Force Outstanding Unit Award	1 July 1989–30 June 1990	349th Air Refueling Squadron
	349th Air Force Outstanding Unit Award	1 September 1991–30 June 1993	349th Air Refueling Squadron
	Air Force Outstanding Unit Award	1 June 1994–31 May 1996	349th Air Refueling Squadron
	Air Force Outstanding Unit Award	1 August 1999–31 July 2000	349th Air Refueling Squadron
	Air Force Outstanding Unit Award	1 August 2000–31 July 2001	349th Air Refueling Squadron
	Air Force Outstanding Unit Award	1 August 2002–31 July 2004	349th Air Refueling Squadron
	Air Force Outstanding Unit Award	1 August 2004–31 July 2005	349th Air Refueling Squadron
	Air Force Outstanding Unit Award	1 August 2005–31 July 2006	349th Air Refueling Squadron
	Air Force Outstanding Unit Award	1 August 2006–31 July 2008	349th Air Refueling Squadron
	Air Force Outstanding Unit Award	1 August 2008–31 July 2009	349th Air Refueling Squadron
	Air Force Outstanding Unit Award	1 August 2009–31 July 2010	349th Air Refueling Squadron
	Air Force Outstanding Unit Award	1 August 2011–31 July 2012	349th Air Refueling Squadron
	French Croix de Guerre with Palm	25 June 1944 –31 December 1944	349th Bombardment Squadron

Campaign Streamer	Campaign	Dates	Notes
	Air Offensive, Europe	2 June 1943 – 5 June 1944	349th Bombardment Squadron
	Air Combat, EAME Theater	2 June 1943 – 11 May 1945	349th Bombardment Squadron
	Normandy	6 June 1944 – 24 July 1944	349th Bombardment Squadron
	Northern France	25 July 1944 – 14 September 1944	349th Bombardment Squadron
	Rhineland	15 September 1944 – 21 March 1945	349th Bombardment Squadron
	Ardennes-Alsace	16 December 1944 – 25 January 1945	349th Bombardment Squadron
	Central Europe	22 March 1944 – 21 May 1945	349th Bombardment Squadron
	Defense of Saudi Arabia	2 August 1990–16 January 1991	349th Air Refueling Squadron
	Liberation and Defense of Kuwait	17 January 1991–11 April 1991	349th Air Refueling Squadron

== See also ==
- List of United States Air Force squadrons
- List of United States Air Force air refueling squadrons
- B-17 Flying Fortress units of the United States Army Air Forces
- List of B-47 units of the United States Air Force
