= 4028th Strategic Reconnaissance Squadron =

The 4028th Strategic Reconnaissance Squadron was a component of the 4080th Strategic Reconnaissance Wing, Strategic Air Command, that operated Lockheed U-2 spy planes out of Laughlin AFB, Texas, and Davis–Monthan AFB, Arizona, in the late 1950s and early 1960s. The unit is also sometimes referred to as the 4028th Strategic Reconnaissance Weather Squadron. It was from this unit that the pilots involved in overflights of Cuba during the Cuban Missile Crisis were drawn. Detachments of the 4028th were deployed to Japan and South Vietnam.

== History ==
The 4080th Strategic Reconnaissance Wing was activated at Turner AFB, Georgia, on 1 April 1956. The first mission was to operate RB-57Ds of Project BLACK KNIGHT, for which purpose the 4025th Strategic Reconnaissance Squadron was assigned to the wing in May 1956. The second mission was to operate the U-2s ordered by SAC under Project Dragon Lady, and the 4028th was created for this purpose. Prior to receiving the U-2s, the 4080th wing moved to Laughlin AFB, TX during February–April 1957.

"A second U-2 squadron, the 4029th SRS, was assigned in expectation that the CIA Project Aquatone would end, and the aircraft be turned over to SAC. This never happened, and the 4029th SRS was never equipped. The wing moved to Davis–Monthan AFB in 1963.

"The 100th SRW was created at Davis–Monthan AFB, Arizona in June 1966 by a renumbering of the 4080th SRW. The U-2 squadron was renumbered from 4028th SRS to the 349th SRS. The 100th Wing also controlled the 350th SRS which operated the Ryan RPVs and the associated DC-130 launch and CH-3 recovery aircraft."
