= William A. Matheny =

United States Air Force general

William Albert Matheny
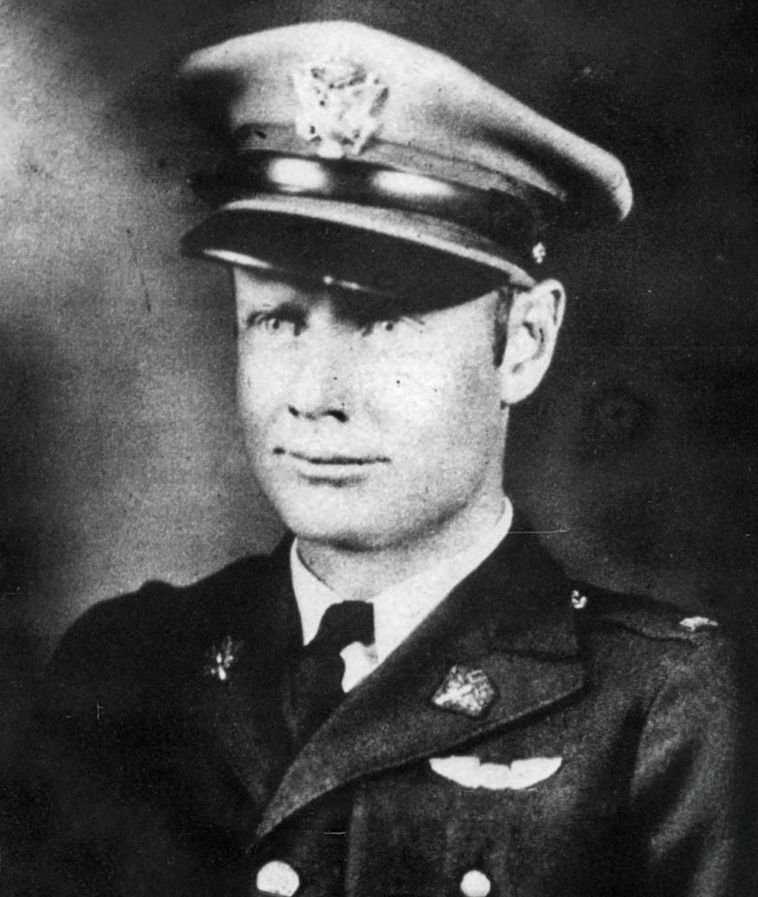
- William A. Matheny, pictured around 1929
- Born: June 6, 1902
- Died: August 8, 1973 (aged 71)
- Military career
- Allegiance: United States of America
- Branch: United States Air Force
- Service years: 1928-195?
- Rank: Brigadier General
- Commands: 28th Air Division; 34th Air Division; 31st Air Division
- Conflicts: World War II
- Awards: Distinguished Flying Cross (2); Legion of Merit; Soldier's Medal; Cheney Award

Brigadier General William Albert Matheny, (June 5, 1902 – August 8, 1973) a native of Carrington, North Dakota, entered the Army Air Corps as a flying cadet in February 1928, two years after his graduation from Marquette University, Milwaukee, Wisconsin, with a degree in electrical engineering.

He was awarded the William H. Cheney Award in 1929 following his graduation from pilot training and commissioning as a second lieutenant in the Air Corps. The Cheney Award is presented by the chief of staff annually for an act of valor, extreme fortitude or self-sacrifice and humanitarian interest, performed during the preceding year in connection with aircraft.

General Matheny served with distinction during World War II in the Asiatic-Pacific theater of operations, taking part in the Central Pacific campaigns. He was decorated by Admiral Chester W. Nimitz, Pacific Fleet commander, for his outstanding service in the Pacific theater during World War II. In early 1948 he assumed command of the U.S. Air Force Advisory Group in Greece.

General Matheny entered the Air Defense Command in June 1950, with his assignment as commanding officer of the 28th Air Division of the Western Air Defense Force at Hamilton Air Force Base, California, and subsequent reassignment to the command of the 34th Air Division, Kirtland Air Force Base, New Mexico.

Prior to his assignment as chief of staff Allied Air Forces Northern Europe with headquarters at Kolsas, Norway, General Matheny commanded the 31st Air Division, Fort Snelling, Minnesota.

He was rated as a command pilot and aircraft observer. He was a graduate of the National War College in Washington, D.C., attended by high level military officers of all branches of the service and their counterparts in government service. General Matheny's decorations included the Distinguished Flying Cross with oak leaf cluster, the Distinguished Service Medal, the Legion of Merit, the Soldier's Medal for heroism and numerous campaign and service ribbons.

He was a member of the first group of Air Corps pilots to ever attempt to fly military aircraft (Keystone Bombers) from the United States (Langley Field) to Panama. While the flight was successful, Lieutenant Matheny's plane did crash in the jungle on the last leg of the flight to France Field, Panama; it was during this incident that he received the Cheney Award.

General Matheny is referenced in Unbroken (2010), written by Laura Hillenbrand, which was later adapted into the film Unbroken. The work chronicles the life of Louis Zamperini, a World War II airman and former Olympian. At the time, Matheny served as commander of the 307th Bombardment Group, to which Zamperini was assigned. On December 24, 1941, the unit conducted a bombing raid on Wake Island involving 26 B-24 aircraft, all of which returned safely to base. In 1943, while participating in a search-and-rescue mission aboard a B-24 bomber, Zamperini’s aircraft crashed into the Pacific Ocean. He survived 47 days adrift at sea before being captured.

Matheny died on August 8, 1973.
