= Royce Williams =

United States Navy aviator (born 1925)

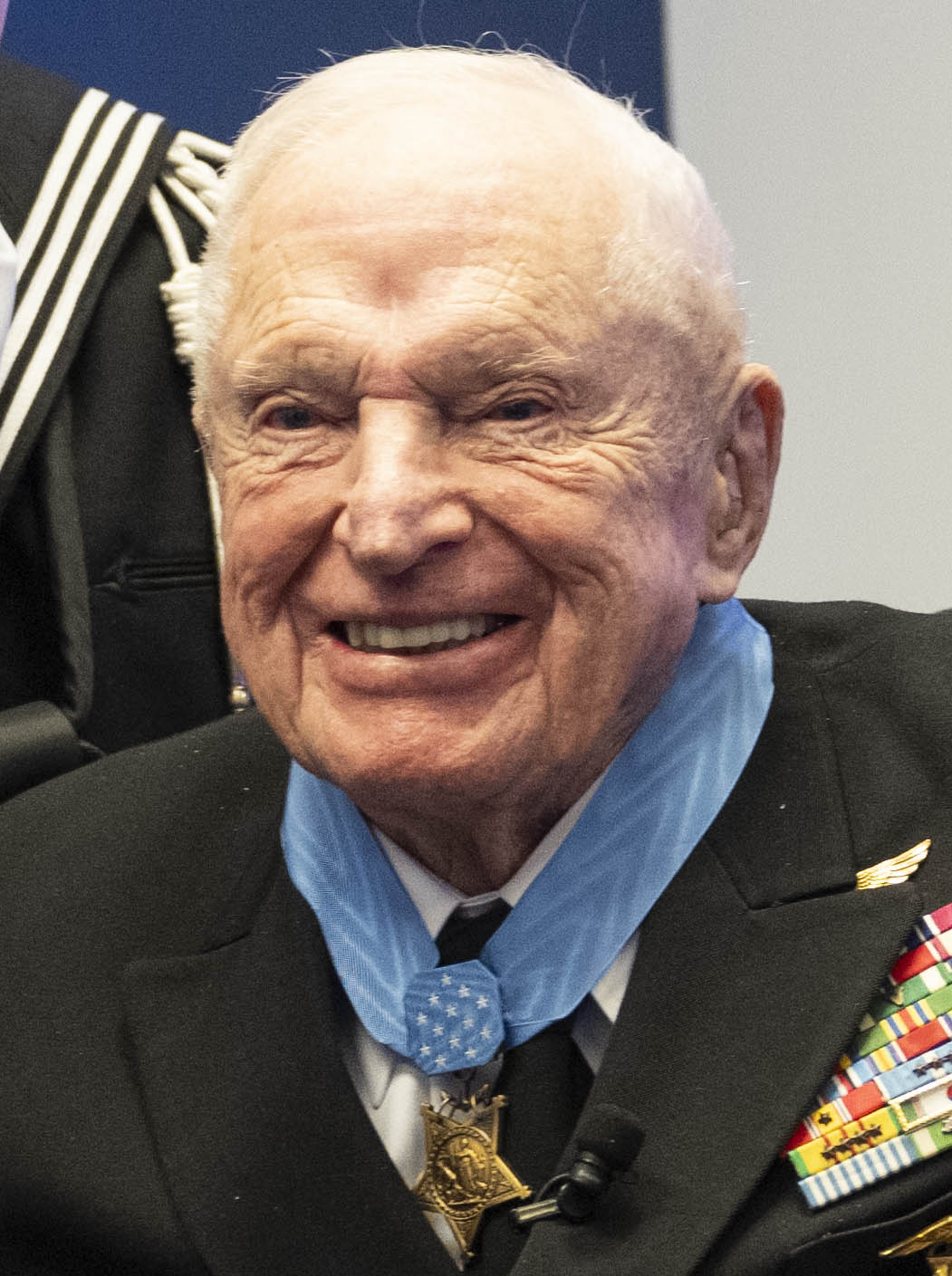
- Williams at Medal of Honor ceremony on February 25, 2026
- Born: Elmer Royce Williams; 4 April 1925 (age 101); Wilmot, South Dakota, U.S.
- Alma mater: University of Minnesota
- Military career
- Branch: United States Navy; Minnesota State Guard
- Service years: 1943–1980
- Rank: Captain (USN); Corporal (MSG)
- Nickname: Royce
- Commands: USS Eldorado; CVW-11; VF-33
- Known for: Downing two Soviet MiG-15s in one engagement during the Korean War
- Conflicts: World War II; Korean War; Vietnam War
- Awards: Medal of Honor; Distinguished Flying Cross (2); Legion of Merit with "V"; Bronze Star Medal; Meritorious Service Medal (2); Air Medal (11); South Korean Order of Military Merit (Taeguk)

Elmer Royce Williams (born 4 April 1925) is a retired United States Navy (USN) naval aviator and Medal of Honor recipient. He is known for his solo dogfight with seven Soviet pilots during the Korean War in 1952, which military experts have called "one of the greatest feats in aviation history". Originally awarded the Silver Star in 1953 for his conduct during the dogfight, in 2023 he was given an upgrade to the Navy Cross, the USN's second highest decoration.

On February 24, 2026, Captain Williams received the Medal of Honor. Captain Williams is the last living Medal of Honor recipient of the Korean War. (Note: Prior to Williams being awarded the Medal of Honor in February 2026, Ralph Puckett Jr. was considered the last living Korean War Medal of Honor recipient.)

== Early life and education ==
Royce Williams was born on 4 April 1925, and grew up in Wilmot, South Dakota and Clinton, Minnesota. He earned the rank of Eagle Scout, and was a corporal in the Minnesota State Guard before joining the Navy. He is one of only twelve known Eagle Scouts who also received the Medal of Honor. The others are Aquilla J. Dyess, Robert Edward Femoyer, Eugene B. Fluckey, Walter Joseph Marm Jr., Thomas R. Norris, Arlo L. Olson, Mitchell Paige, Benjamin L. Salomon, Leo K. Thorsness, and Jay Zeamer. He and his brother aspired to become pilots; both enlisted during World War II, although Royce Williams' flight training was deferred while he attended college in Minnesota.

== Career ==
Williams trained on the Naval Aircraft Factory N3N at Murray, Kentucky and Conway, Arkansas in 1944; and in 1945 on the N2S, SNV, SNJ and SBD at NAS Memphis, Tennessee and NAS Pensacola, Florida. He qualified as a naval aviator at NAS Pensacola in August 1945. In 1946, Williams was declared operational on the F6F Hellcat at NAS Miami, Florida and deployed with VBF-81 onboard USS Franklin D. Roosevelt and USS Princeton (CV-37). In 1946, he also served with VBF-98, flying the Vought F4U Corsair. From 1946 to 1949, Williams returned to USS Princeton, flying the F4U and F8F, as part of VF-81, VF-13A and VF-131. From 1949 to 1950, Williams studied for his Bachelor of Arts at the University of Minnesota, and then in 1951 for his Master's at the Naval Postgraduate School in Monterey, California. From 1952 to 1954, he was deployed on USS Oriskany with VF-781, and on USS Boxer with VF-121. Williams was stationed at Nellis Air Force Base in Nevada from 1954 to 1956, flying the North American F-86 Sabre (E/F/H variants) and the North American F-100 Super Sabre. In 1957, he was stationed at Naval Air Facility El Centro in El Centro, California, flying the North American FJ-3 Fury. At El Centro, during an assisted takeoff flying the F9F Panther, Williams suffered injuries to his back and neck when the aircraft crashed due to engine failure. In 1958, Williams attended the Joint Forces Staff College in Norfolk, Virginia. From 1959 to 1960, he was deployed with VF-173 onboard USS Intrepid (CV-11) and USS Independence (CV-62), flying the FJ-3 as Assistant Air Operations. Williams then flew the Vought F-8E Crusader with VF-124 from 1960 to 1961. From 1961 to 1963, he was the supervisor of officer promotions at the Bureau of Naval Personnel (BUPERS). From 1963 to 1964, he was a RAG (Fleet Replacement Squadron) Student with VF-174. Williams was the commanding officer of VF-33 from July 1964 to August 1965, which flew the F-8E off USS Enterprise (CVN-65) and the McDonnell Douglas F-4B Phantom II off USS America (CV-66).

Early in his career, he learned to fly the F9F-5 Panther jet and was assigned to a fleet fighter squadron during the Korean War, during which he flew 70 missions.

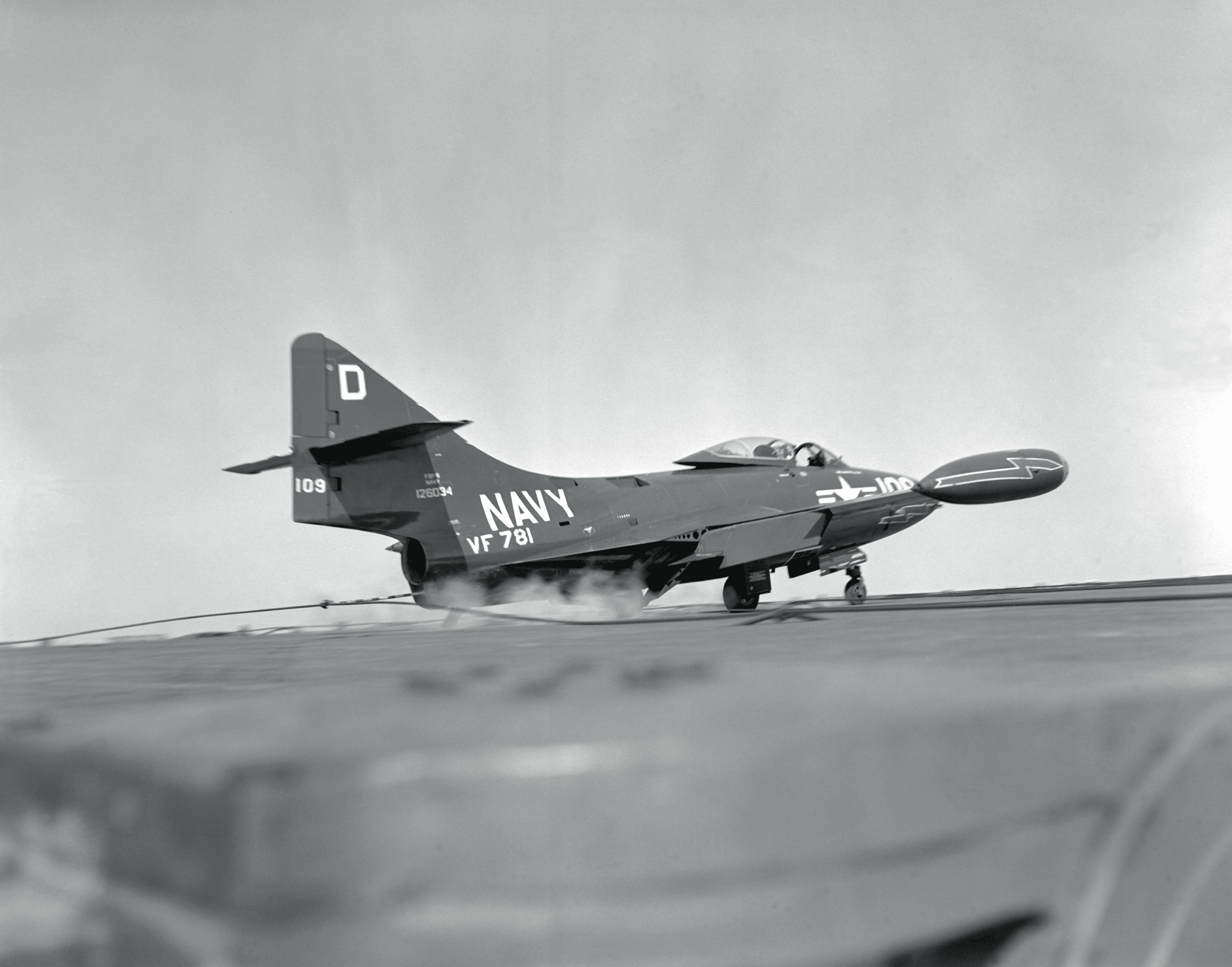
A VF-781 F9F lands on the USS Oriskany in November 1952

In 1952, then-Lieutenant Williams was serving with VF-781 aboard the USS Oriskany as part of Task Force 77. On 18 November 1952, on his second mission of the day, while on combat air patrol near Hoeryong, North Korea, his group of four pilots spotted seven MiG-15s overhead. Two of the other three pilots had to return to the carrier and the MiGs began attacking Williams, putting him into a 35-minute dogfight with seven MiG-15s. It is believed to be the longest dogfight in U.S. Navy history. Commanders on his carrier ordered him away, but Williams had to tell them he was already fighting for his life. He shot down four MiGs and likely hit two others. By the end of the 35-minute period, only one of the MiGs was still in the air with him, and he managed to escape to his carrier, out of ammunition and having lost his hydraulics. He was uninjured, but 263 holes were counted in his Panther jet. Some accounts state he never saw the plane again as it was pushed into the sea.

The story of his battle with the Soviet MiGs led to Williams being debriefed at the time by admirals, the Secretary of Defense, and a few weeks later by newly inaugurated President Dwight D. Eisenhower. These authorities decided to cover up the specifics of the battle, because the Soviet Union was not officially a combatant in the Korean War, and it was feared publicity about the air battle would draw the Soviets further into the conflict. The dogfight was scrubbed from U.S. Navy and National Security Agency records, and Williams was sworn to secrecy about the incident—so much so that he never told anyone about it, not even his wife nor his pilot brother, until Korean War records were declassified in 2002. The record of the incident in Navy records said he only shot down one enemy (not listed as "Soviet") plane and damaged another, for which he was awarded the Silver Star in 1953.

However, the dogfight was recorded in Soviet archives which were released after the fall of the Soviet Union in the 1990s. The Soviet records say only one of four MiGs returned to base. A 2014 Russian book, Red Devils over the Yalu: A Chronicle of Soviet Aerial Operations in the Korean War 1950–53, describes the battle and mentions Williams. The four MiGs were flown by Soviet Naval Aviation pilots, with Captain Beliakov and Lieutenants Pakhomkin and Vandaev being shot down, and Lieutenant Pushkarev returning to base.

In his book Holding the Line about Task Force 77, Thomas McKelvey Cleaver described the fight, saying "On November 18, 1952, Royce Williams became the top-scoring carrier-based naval aviator and the top-scoring naval aviator in a Navy jet of the 'forgotten war'." He added, "In the fight of his life, Royce Williams had accomplished what no other American fighter pilot would ever accomplish: shoot down four MiG-15s in one fight."

From December 1965 to January 1967, Williams flew 110 missions in A-4 Skyhawks and F-4 Phantoms from the aircraft carrier USS Kitty Hawk during the Vietnam War, as the commanding officer of Carrier Air Wing Eleven (CVW-11). From 1967 to 1969, he was on the staff of the Chief of Naval Operations (OPNAV), and also the Director of POW/MIA Matters at BUPERS. He supervised the repatriation of American personnel from North Korea after the capture of USS Pueblo (AGER-2) and the 1969 EC-121 shootdown. Williams was the commanding officer of the command ship USS Eldorado between September 1969 and January 1971. From 1971 to 1973, he was on the staff of CINCPAC, serving as the Battle Staff Chief, Deputy J3C and Inspector General. Williams was the Chief of Staff for the Commander, Fleet Air, Western Pacific (CFWP( from 1973 to 1974. In 1975, he was appointed the Assistant Chief of Staff (Operations) to the Commander, Training Command, Pacific Fleet. However, he was placed on the Temporary Disability Retired List in September 1975 after evaluation at the Naval Medical Center San Diego.

Williams retired from the Navy as a captain in January 1980. In retirement, he lives in Escondido, California. He accumulated around 4,500 flight hours in his career, with 3,000 of these on jet aircraft and 1,500 on propeller aircraft. Williams also totaled 518 aircraft carrier landings, all on fixed-wing aircraft. He also survived an undated accident, when both engines on an F-4 Phantom II he was flying caught fire. His radar intercept officer (RIO) ejected, and Williams brought the aircraft back to the base. This enabled US Navy engineers to finally identify and fix the twin engine fire problem, because previously any such incidents meant crew members ejected and the plane was not salvaged.

== Secrecy ==
Williams maintained his secrecy about his aerial feat for decades. After the information was declassified, he shared his story with close friends and spoke about it at small gatherings. His story first received national attention when the American Legion Magazine published a cover story in November 2017.

In the story, Williams detailed the aerial battle, his vow of secrecy and his other military service. Williams, a longtime member of The American Legion, also received support from the national organization. In August 2017, the Legion's National Executive Committee approved Resolution 70, which calls for the Legion to petition Congress and the Department of Defense to award the Medal of Honor to recognize Williams.

== Medal of Honor campaign ==
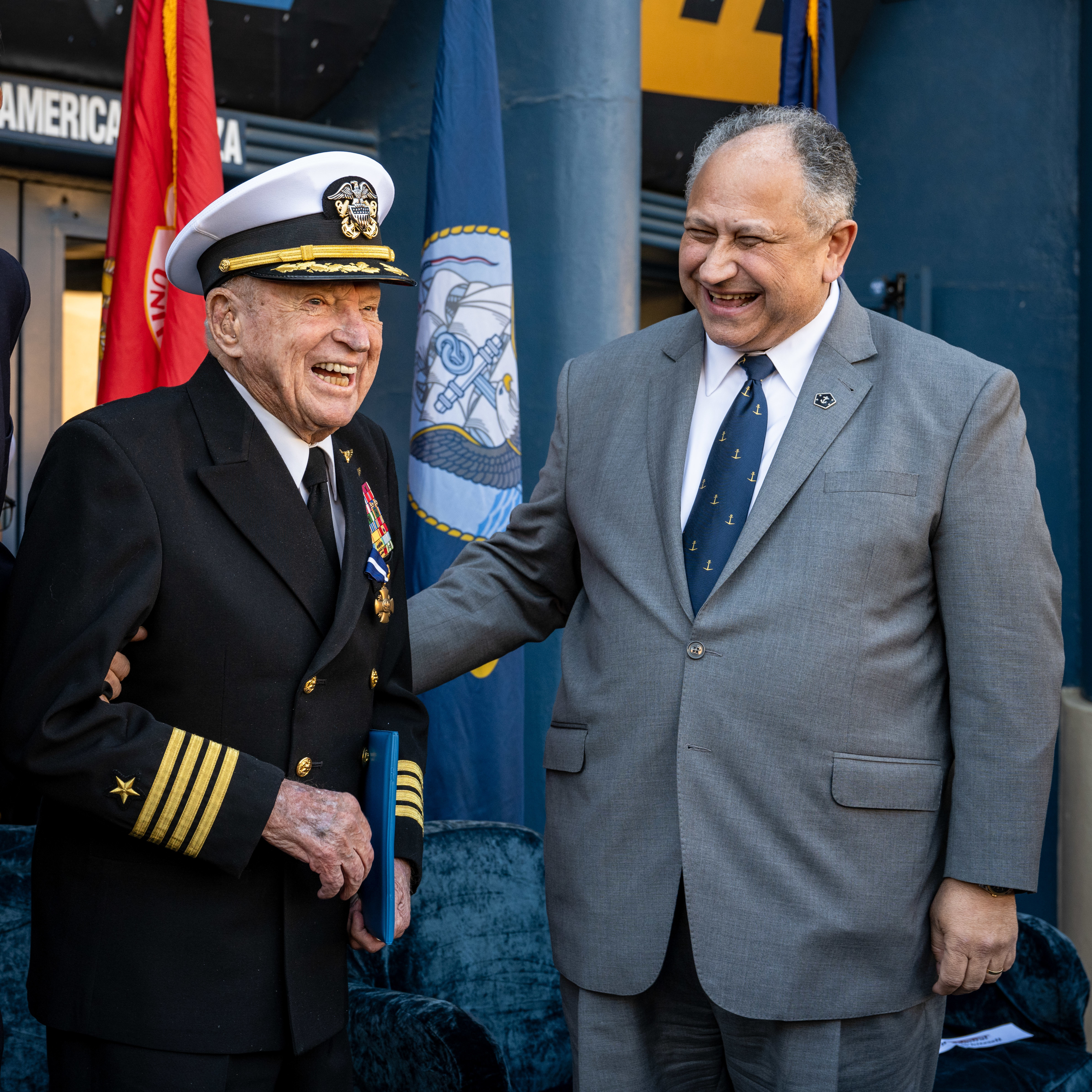
Williams with U.S. Secretary of the Navy Carlos Del Toro after being awarded the Navy Cross (20 January 2023)

In 2014, retired Rear Admiral Doniphan Shelton became aware of Williams' feat, and he began an unsuccessful years-long campaign for the Navy or Department of Defense to recommend him for the Medal of Honor for his exploit. Shelton said Williams' heroism was "unmatched either in the Korean War, the Vietnam War, or since then". On 14 July 2022, a bipartisan group of five congressmen persuaded the House of Representatives to approve an amendment to the Defense Authorization Act which would waive the statute of limitations for a potential Medal of Honor for Williams. The amendment and bill were approved for the House version of the bill, which were then forwarded to the United States Senate, which removed the provision in conference.

In December 2022 Williams was awarded the Navy Cross as an upgrade of the Silver Star the Navy awarded him in 1953. The award was approved by U.S. Secretary of the Navy Carlos Del Toro, who said, "Having reviewed the findings of now numerous investigations related to the case of Capt. Royce Williams, I have determined this case to be special and extraordinary. His actions clearly distinguished himself during a high-risk mission and deserve proper recognition."

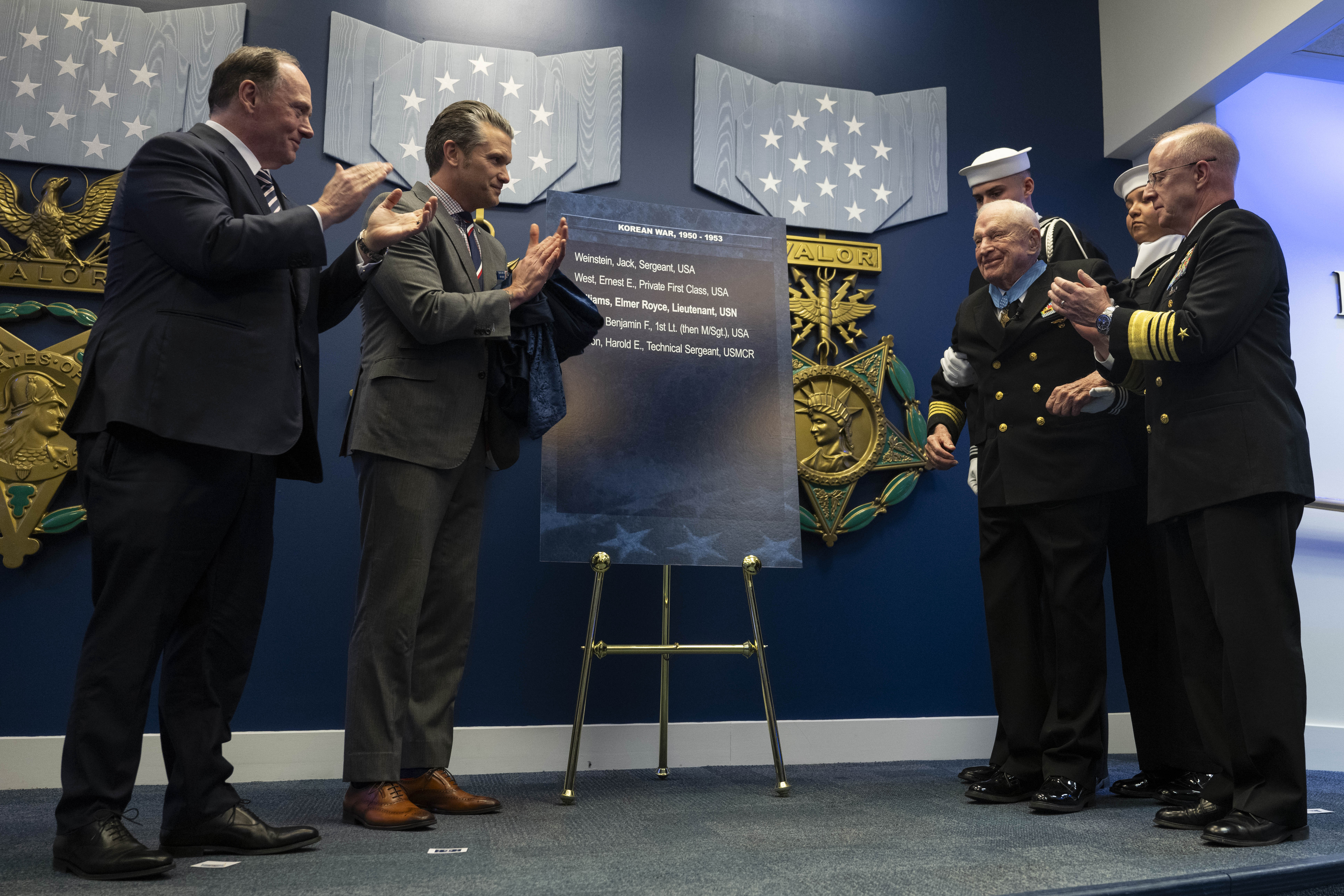
Williams with Secretary of Defense Pete Hegseth (second from left) during the Hall of Heroes induction ceremony at the Pentagon (2026)

On 4 February 2026, Williams' congressman Darrell Issa announced confirmation from President Donald Trump that Williams would be receiving the Medal of Honor. The award was received at the 2026 State of the Union Address on 24 February 2026, presented by First Lady Melania Trump. Following the awarding, Williams is the last living Korean War Medal of Honor recipient.

An American Legion post in Encinitas, California, where Williams is a member, is planning to rename itself for him.

== Medal of Honor Citation ==
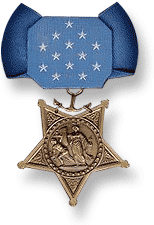

For conspicuous gallantry and intrepidity at the risk of his life above and beyond the call of duty on 18 November 1952 while leading a division of three jet fighters attached to Fighter Squadron SEVEN HUNDRED EIGHTY-ONE (VF-781) and embarked on the USS ORISKANY. While flying a combat patrol mission over the northeastern coastal waters of enemy-held North Korea, Lieutenant Williams demonstrated extraordinary heroism by intercepting a superior force of attacking enemy MiG-15 fighters in order to protect the ships of Task Force 77. After thwarting the enemy’s initial attack, he maneuvered his aircraft to make two firing passes on one MiG, which then spiraled into the sea. He inflicted heavy damage to a second MiG-15, which started smoking badly and retired from the fight. When his own aircraft was severely damaged by a direct hit from one of the remaining enemy MiG-15s, Lieutenant WIlliams evaded further enemy attack while continuing to direct the dogfight. He eventually found cover in a cloud bank, broke off the engagement, and miraculously landed his nearly uncontrollable aircraft on the USS ORISKANY. His exceptional airmanship, coupled with his complete disregard for his own personal safety, resulted in the destruction of three enemy MiG-15s and severe damage to a fourth, and undoubtedly saved the lives of hundreds of Task Force 77 sailors. By his undaunted courage, bold initiative, and total devotion to duty, Lieutenant Williams reflected great credit upon himself and upheld the highest traditions of the United States Naval Service.

== Awards and decorations ==
His medals include the Medal of Honor, the Legion of Merit with Combat "V" and two Distinguished Flying Crosses.

Badge	Naval Aviator Badge		
1st row	Medal of Honor		
2nd row	Legion of Merit with "V" Device	Distinguished Flying Cross with 5/16-inch star	Bronze Star Medal
3rd row	Meritorious Service Medal with 5/16-inch star	Air Medal with 10 5/16-inch stars	Navy Commendation Medal with "V" Device
4th row	Navy Unit Commendation with 1 Service star	Navy Meritorious Unit Commendation	China Service Medal
5th row	American Campaign Medal	World War II Victory Medal	Navy Occupation Service Medal with 'Asia' clasp
6th row	National Defense Service Medal with 1 Service star	Korean Service Medal with 3 Campaign stars	Armed Forces Expeditionary Medal
7th row	Vietnam Service Medal with 4 Campaign stars	Korean Presidential Unit Citation	RVN Gallantry Cross Unit Citation with Palm
8th row	United Nations Service Medal Korea	Vietnam Campaign Medal	Korean War Service Medal Retroactively awarded, 2003

Foreign awards

Order of Military Merit

Taeguk Cordon Medal

== In popular culture ==
In 2020, a 20-minute documentary, Actions Speak Louder Than Medals – the Royce Williams Story, directed by John Mollison, was screened at the GI Film Festival, San Diego. Captain Royce Williams dictated his life story to author W. Craig Reed for his book, The 7 Secrets of Neuron Leadership, the only book in print with Royce's full biographical life story. Reed lives near Royce and spent many nights on his balcony listening to his incredible “sea stories.” Royce notes that President Eisenhower convinced him to switch from bourbon to scotch, however, Reed introduced Royce to Monkey Shoulder scotch, which is now the only drink he prefers.

== See also ==
- List of Medal of Honor recipients
- List of Korean War Medal of Honor recipients
