= Operation Deep Water =

1957 NATO naval exercise

- Part of the Cold War (1953–1962)
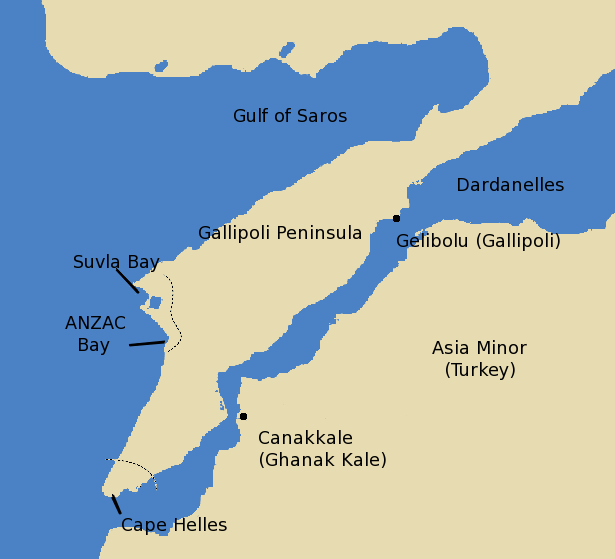
- Saros Gulf
- Type: NATO multi-lateral exercises
- Location: NATO Southern Region: Aegean Sea, Turkey
- Planned by: Allied Forces Southern Europe (AFSOUTH)
- Objective: Deployment of NATO naval and amphibious assault forces
- Date: September 1957
- Executed by: Vice Admiral Charles R. Brown, USN, Commander Naval Striking and Support Forces Southern Europe (COMSTRIKFORSOUTH)
- Outcome: Exercise executed.

Operation Deep Water was a 1957 NATO naval exercise held in the Mediterranean Sea that simulated protecting the Dardanelles from a Soviet invasion. By controlling this bottleneck in a war situation, the Soviet Black Sea Fleet would be prevented from entering the Mediterranean.

Operation Deep Water was part of a series of NATO military exercises that took place in Fall 1957. This exercise featured a simulated nuclear air strike in the Gallipoli area, reflecting NATO's nuclear umbrella policy to offset the Soviet Union's numerical superiority of ground forces in Europe. Operation Deep Water also involved the first units of the United States Marine Corps to participate in a helicopter-borne vertical envelopment/air assault operation during an overseas deployment.

== Operational history ==
The exercise took place within the Allied Forces Southern Europe area of responsibility, and was conducted by one of AFSOUTH's subordinate commands, Naval Striking and Support Forces Southern Europe (STRIKFORSOUTH), commanded by Vice Admiral Charles R. Brown, USN, who also commanded the United States Sixth Fleet. A total of 96 warships participated in Operation Deep Water.

The scenario for Operation Deep Water was that NATO forces would protect the Dardanelles from a Soviet invasion in order to prevent the Soviet Black Sea Fleet from gaining access to the Mediterranean Sea. Given the overwhelming numerical superiority of Soviet Union and Warsaw Pact military forces, NATO embraced the concept of the nuclear umbrella to protect Western Europe from a Soviet ground invasion. Consequently, Operation Deep Water opened with a simulated atomic air strike in the Gallipoli area on 25 September 1957.

Operation Deep Water culminated with the landing of 8,000 U.S. Marines at Saros Gulf near Gallipoli, Turkey, from a 38-ship amphibious task force led by flagship USS Pocono, on 29 September 1957. The principal U.S. Marine unit was the 6th Marines (Reinforced), commanded by Colonel Austin Shofner, USMC. Operation Deep Water saw the 3rd Battalion, 6th Marines, become the first unit of the United States Marines Corps to participate in a helicopter-borne air assault operation ('vertical envelopment') during an overseas deployment. It was also the first time that a U.S. Marine joint air-sea-ground task force had been used in a NATO exercise.

Air support was provided by aircraft carriers from the U.S. Sixth Fleet throughout all phases of Operation Deep Water. During the exercise, the NATO amphibious task force was repeatedly over-flown by an unidentified Bulgarian-based Tupolev Tu-16 twin-engine jet bomber over a three-day period, prompting Admiral Brown to order two FJ-3 jet fighters to intercept it. The Tu-16 may have come from 199th Guards or 290th ODRAPs of 46th Air Army, Long Range Aviation.

== U.S. units involved in the exercise ==
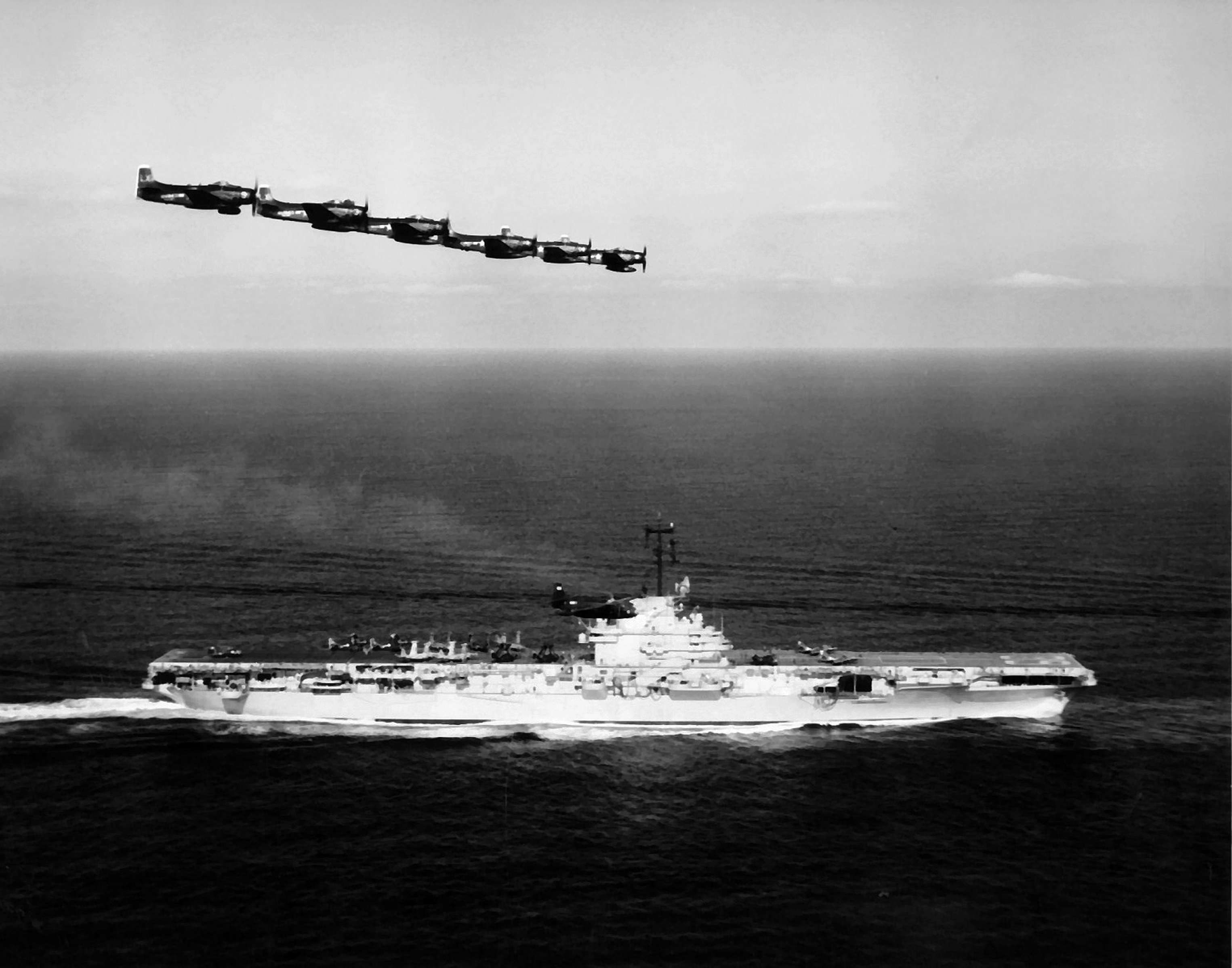
USS Lake Champlain with VMA-324

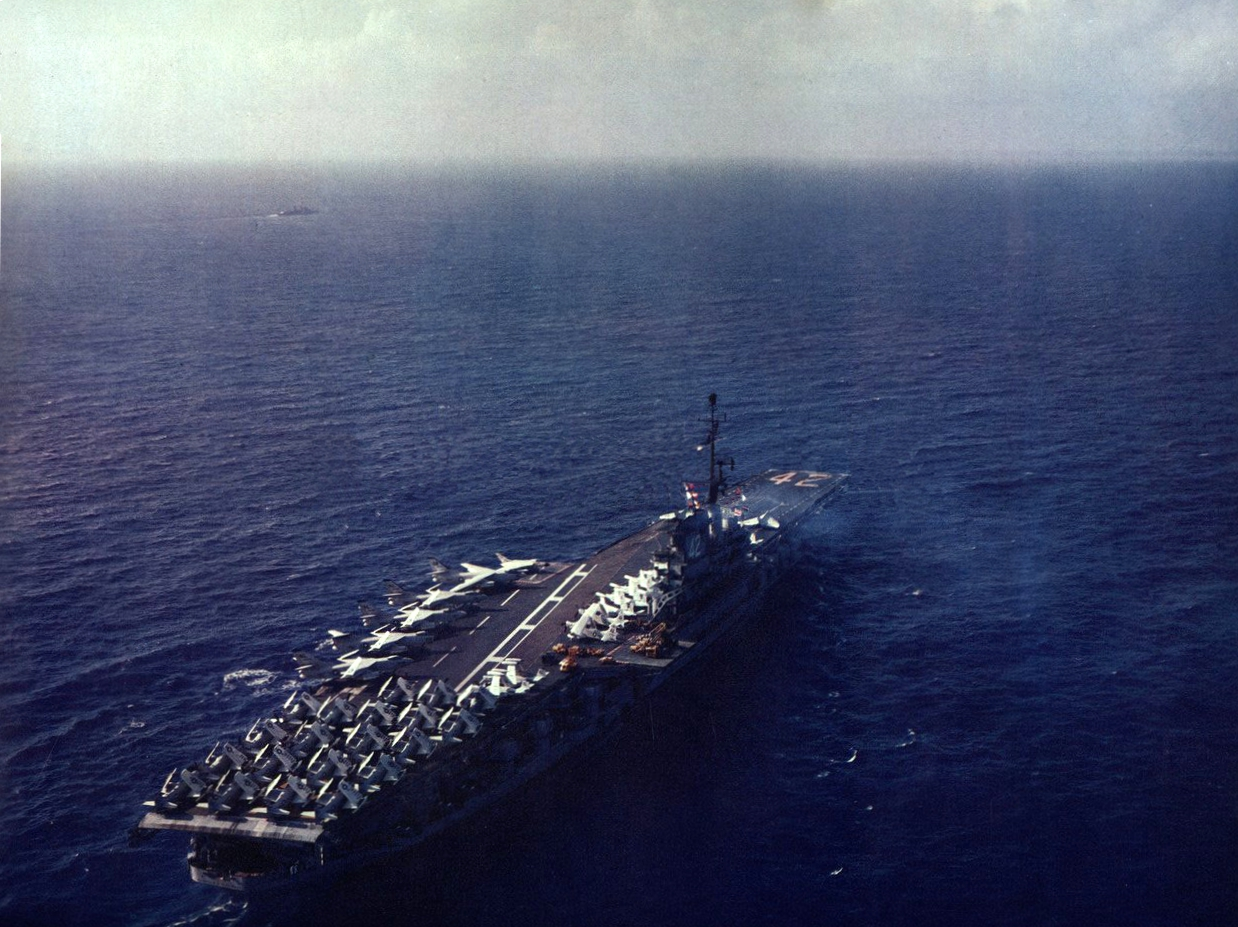
USS Franklin D. Roosevelt

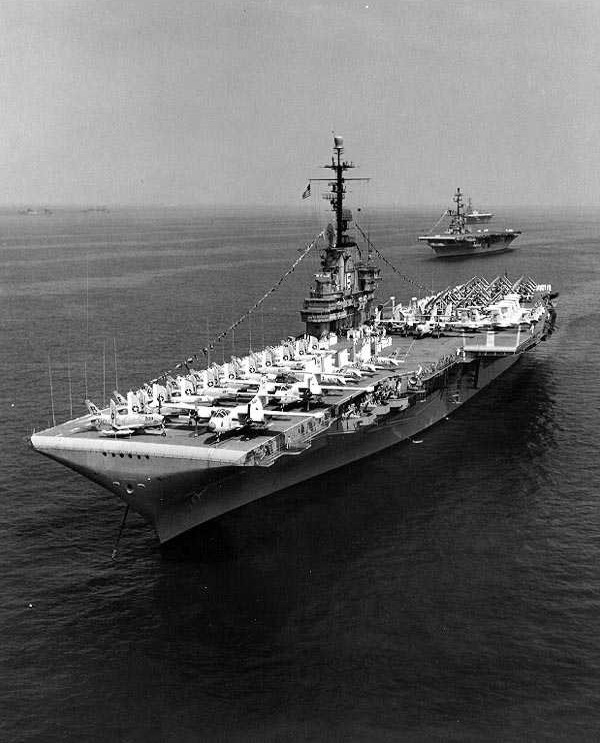
USS Randolph

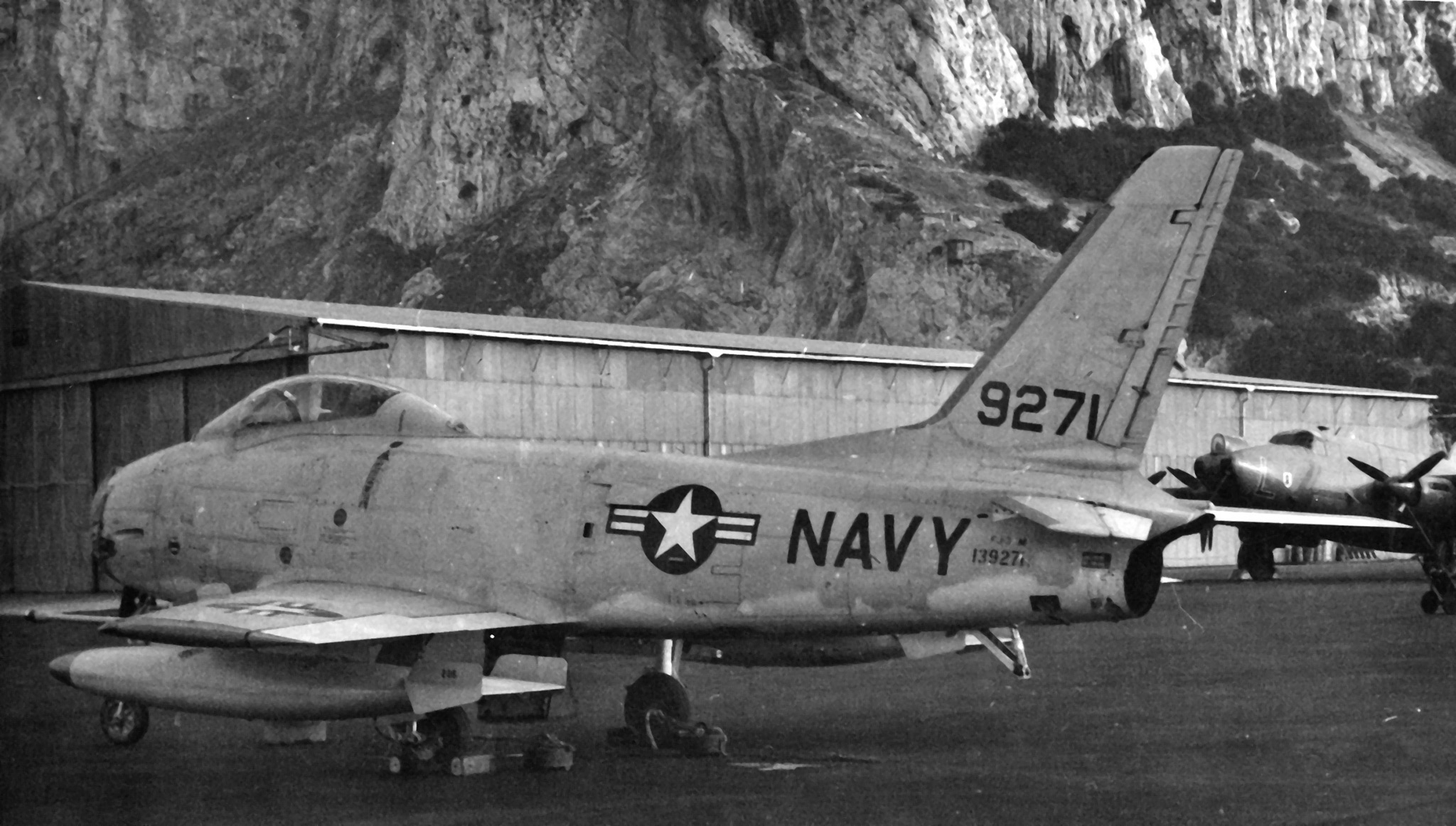
FJ-3M 139271 of VF-173 visiting Gibraltar during Operation Deep Water, 1957

=== U.S. Marine Corps units ===
The following United States Marine Corps units participated

- Regimental Landing Team 6 (RLT-6)
  - 3rd Battalion 6th Marines
  - 2nd Amphibious Reconnaissance Company
- U.S. Marine aviation units embarked on board USS Lake Champlain (CVS-39)
  - Marine Fighter Squadron 312 (VMF-312) — North American FJ-3/3M Fury
  - Marine Attack Squadron 324 (VMA-324) — Douglas AD-4B Skyraider
  - Marine Attack Squadron 533 (VMA-533) — Grumman F9F-8 Cougar
  - Marine Aircraft Group 26 (MAG-26)
    - Marine Helicopter Transport Squadron (Medium) 461 (HMR(M)-461) — Sikorsky HRS-3
    - Marine Light Helicopter Squadron 262 (HMR(L)-262) — Sikorsky HR2S-1

=== U.S. Navy carrier aviation units ===
Carrier Air Group 17 (CVG-17) embarked on board USS Franklin D. Roosevelt (CVA-42):

- Fighter Squadron 173 (VF-173): FJ-3M Fury
- Fighter Squadron 171 (VF-171): F2H-3 Banshee
- Fighter Squadron 74 (VF-74): F4D-1 Skyray
- Attack Squadron 175 (VA-175): AD-6 Skyraider
- Heavy Attack Squadron (VAH-3): A3D-1 Skywarrior
- All-Weather Attack Squadron 33 (VA(AW)-33), Detachment 37: AD-5N Skyraider
- Carrier Airborne Early Warning Squadron 12 (VAW-12), Detachment 37: AD-5W Skyraider
- Photographic Reconnaissance Squadron 62 (VFP-62), Detachment 37: F2H-2P Banshee & F9F-6P Cougar
- Utility Helicopter Squadron 2, Detachment 37: HUP-2

Carrier Air Group 4 (CVG-4) embarked on board USS Randolph (CVA-15) (pictured):

- Fighter Squadron 73 (VF-73): FJ-3/3M Fury
- Fighter Squadron 43 (VF-43): F9F-8 Cougar
- Fighter Squadron 22 (VF-22): F2H-4 Banshee
- Attack Squadron 45 (VA-45): AD-6 Skyraider
- Heavy Attack Squadron 7 (VAH-7), Detachment 36: AJ-2 Savage
- Carrier Airborne Early Warning Squadron 12 (VAW-12), Detachment 36: AD-5W Skyraider
- Photographic Reconnaissance Squadron 62 (VFP-62), Detachment 36: F9F-6P Cougar
- Utility Helicopter Squadron 2 (HU-2), Detachment 36: HUP-2

== Outcome ==
Vice Admiral Brown summarized the results from Operation Deep Water by noting: "If I were the Russians, I'd get the hell out of there (Dardanelles) if a war started. With what we've got, we could make monkey meat out of them."

Operation Deep Water took place as part of a series of concurrent NATO exercises held during the fall of 1957 which were the most ambitious military undertaking for NATO to date, involving more than 250,000 men, 300 ships, and 1,500 aircraft operating from Norway to Turkey. These other 1957 exercises were Operation Strikeback, which concentrated on NATO's eastern Atlantic/northern European flank; Operation Counter Punch involving Allied Forces Central Europe on the European mainland; Operation Stand Firm in the English Channel; Operation Sea Watch, a convoy escort exercise in the North Atlantic Ocean; and Operation Fend Off/Operation Fishplay, an anti-submarine exercise in the Greenland-Iceland-UK gap ("GIUK gap").

== See also ==
- Cold War (1953–1962)
- Gallipoli Campaign (1915–1916)
