= List of Sabre and Fury units in the US military =

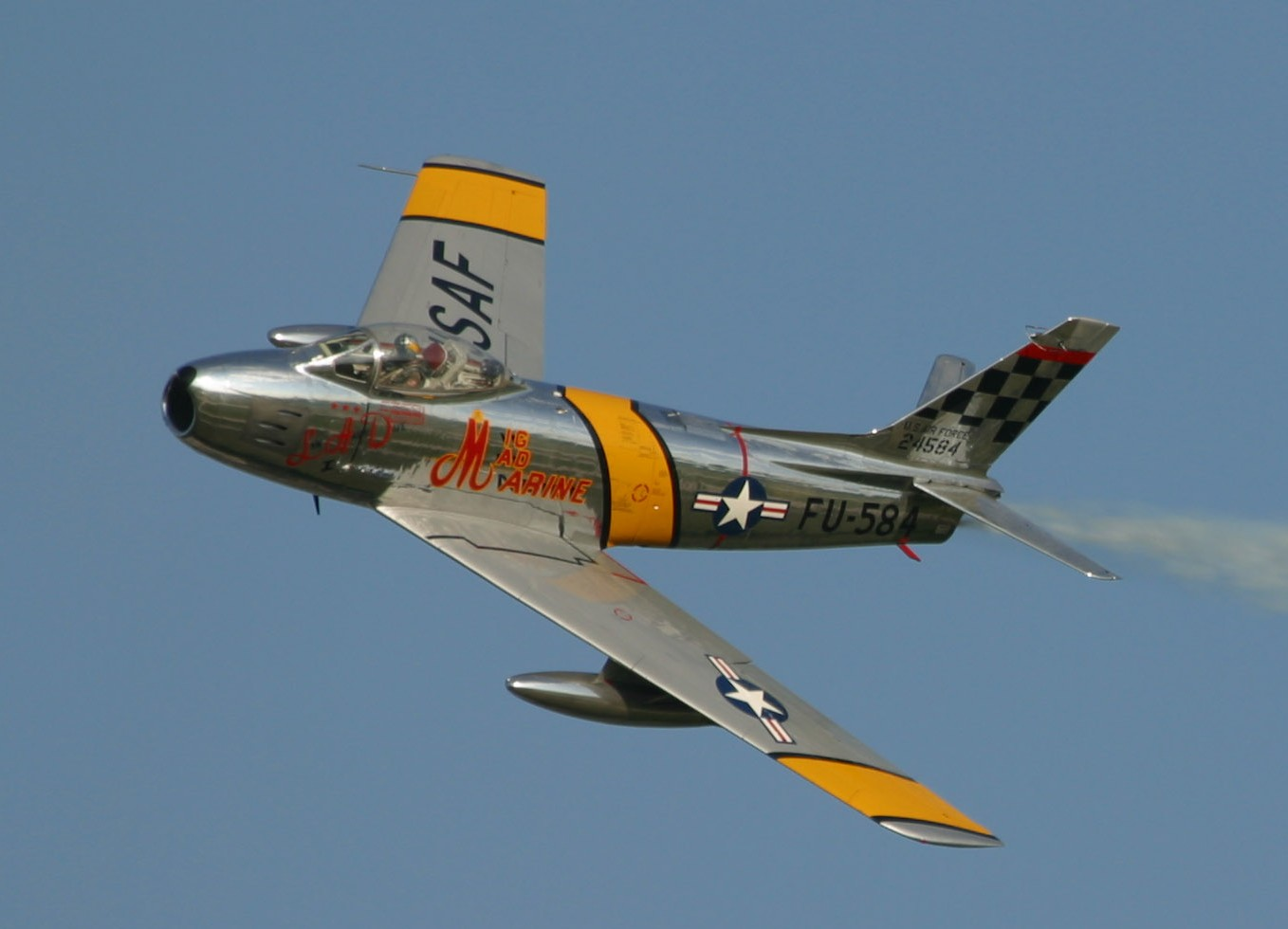
F-86 Sabre in flight.

List of Sabre and Fury units in the US military identifies the military branches and units that used the North American Aviation F-86 Sabre and FJ Fury. Units existed in U.S. Air Force, Air National Guard, Air Force Reserve Command, U.S. Navy, and the U.S. Marine Corps.

== USAF F-86 Units ==
Source: Baugher F-86D

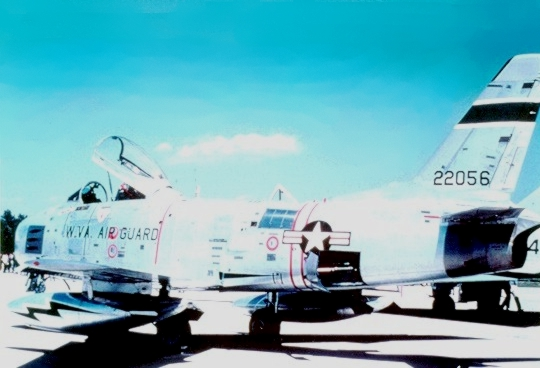
A West Virginia Air National Guard F-86H.

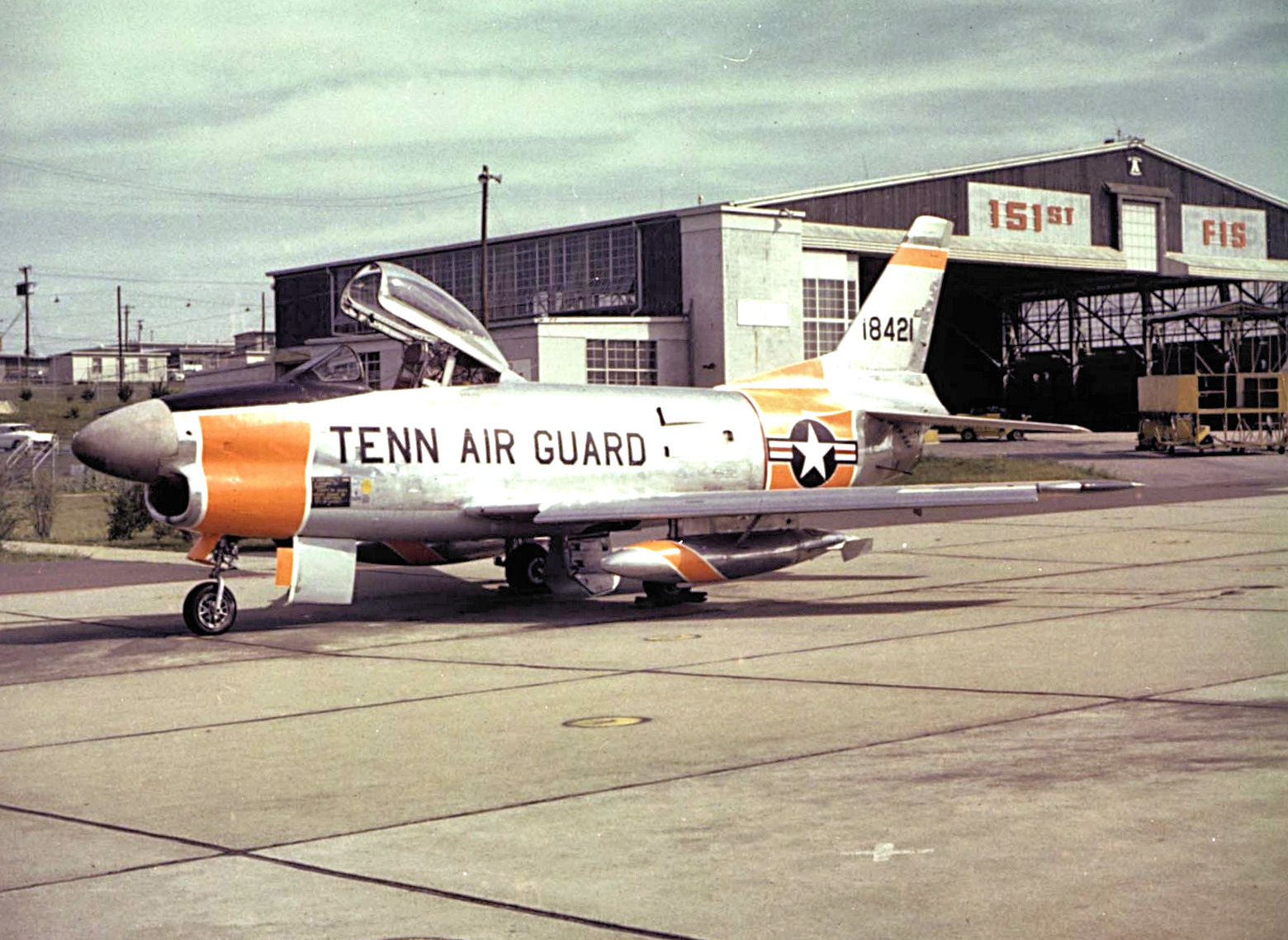
A Tennessee Air Guard F-86D.

=== Air National Guard Squadrons ===
- 102d, New York ANG (1957–1959)
- 104th, Massachusetts ANG (1957–1965)
- 111th, Texas ANG (1957–1960)
- 113th, Indiana ANG (1956–1958)
- 120th, Colorado ANG (1960–1961)
- 122d, Louisiana ANG (1957–1960)
- 125th, Oklahoma ANG (1957–1960)
- 127th, 184th Wing Kansas ANG (1958–1961)
- 128th, Georgia ANG (1960–1961)
- 133d, New Hampshire ANG (1958–1960)
- 144th, California ANG (1958–1964)
- 146th, Pennsylvania ANG (1957–1960)
- 147th, Pennsylvania ANG (1958–1961)
- 151st, Tennessee ANG (1957–1960)
- 156th, North Carolina ANG (1959–1960)
- 157th, South Carolina ANG (1958–1960)
- 159th, Florida ANG (1956–1960)
- 163rd, Indiana ANG (1956–1958)
- 173d, Nebraska ANG (1957–1964)
- 181st, Texas ANG (1957–1964)
- 182d, Texas ANG (1957–1960)
- 185th, Oklahoma ANG (1958–1961)
- 186th, Montana ANG (1953–1955)
- 187th, Wyoming ANG (1958–1961)
- 190th, Idaho ANG (1959–1964)
- 191st, Utah ANG (1958–1961)
- 192d, Nevada ANG (1958–1961)
- 194th, California ANG (1958–1965)
- 196th, California ANG (1958–1965)
- 197th, Arizona ANG (1957–1960)
- 198th, Puerto Rico ANG (1958–1960)
- 199th, Hawaii ANG (1958–1961)

=== Air Force units ===
Source: Baugher F-86F and F-86E

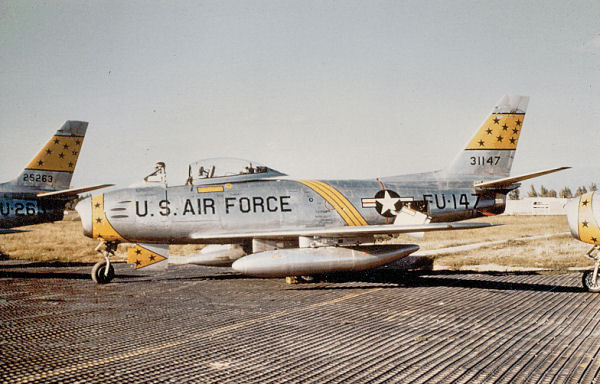
An F-86F of the 21st Fighter Day Wing at Chambley Air Base.

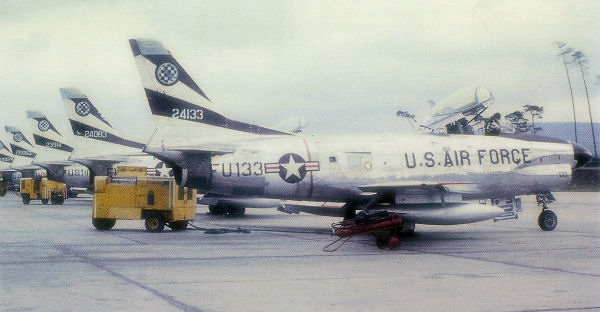
A 514th FIS F-86D at Ramstein Air Base.

- 1st Fighter-Interceptor Wing—F-86E
- 4th Fighter-Interceptor Wing (334th, 335th, 336th Squadrons) – F-86E, F
- 8th Fighter Bomber Wing (35th, 36th, 80th Squadrons) – F-86F
- 18th Fighter Interceptor Wing (12th, 44th, 55th Squadrons) – F-86F
- 21st Fighter Interceptor Wing (92d, 416th, 531st Squadrons) – F-86F
- 33d Fighter Interceptor Wing (58th, 59th, 60th Squadrons) – F-86E
- 36th Fighter Interceptor Wing (23d, 32d, 53d Squadrons) – F-86F
- 48th Fighter Interceptor Wing (492d, 493d, 494th Squadrons) – F-86F
- 50th Fighter Bomber Wing (10th, 81st, 417th Squadrons) – F-86F
- 51st Fighter Interceptor Wing (16th, 25th, 39th Squadrons) – F-86E, F
- 56th Fighter Interceptor Wing (61st, 62nd, 63rd Squadrons) – F-86E
- 58th Fighter Interceptor Wing (69th, 310th, 311th Squadrons) – F-86F
- 81st Fighter Interceptor Wing (78th, 91st, 92d Squadrons) – F-86F
- 312th Fighter Bomber Wing (386th, 387th, 388th Squadrons) – F-86H
- 322d Fighter Interceptor Wing (450th, 451st, 452d Squadrons) – F-86F
- 366th Fighter Interceptor Wing (389th, 390th, 391st Squadrons) – F-86F
- 388th Fighter Interceptor Wing (561st, 562d, 563d Squadrons) – F-86F
- 406th Fighter Interceptor Wing (512th, 513th, 514th Squadrons) – F-86F
- 450th Fighter Interceptor Wing (721st, 722d, 723d Squadrons) – F-86F
- 474th Fighter Interceptor Wing (428th, 429th, 430th Squadrons) – F-86F
- 479th Fighter Interceptor Wing (431st, 434th, 435th Squadrons) – F-86F
- 4th Fighter-Interceptor Squadron – F-86A

== US Navy units with FJ Fury ==
Source: Baugher Fury

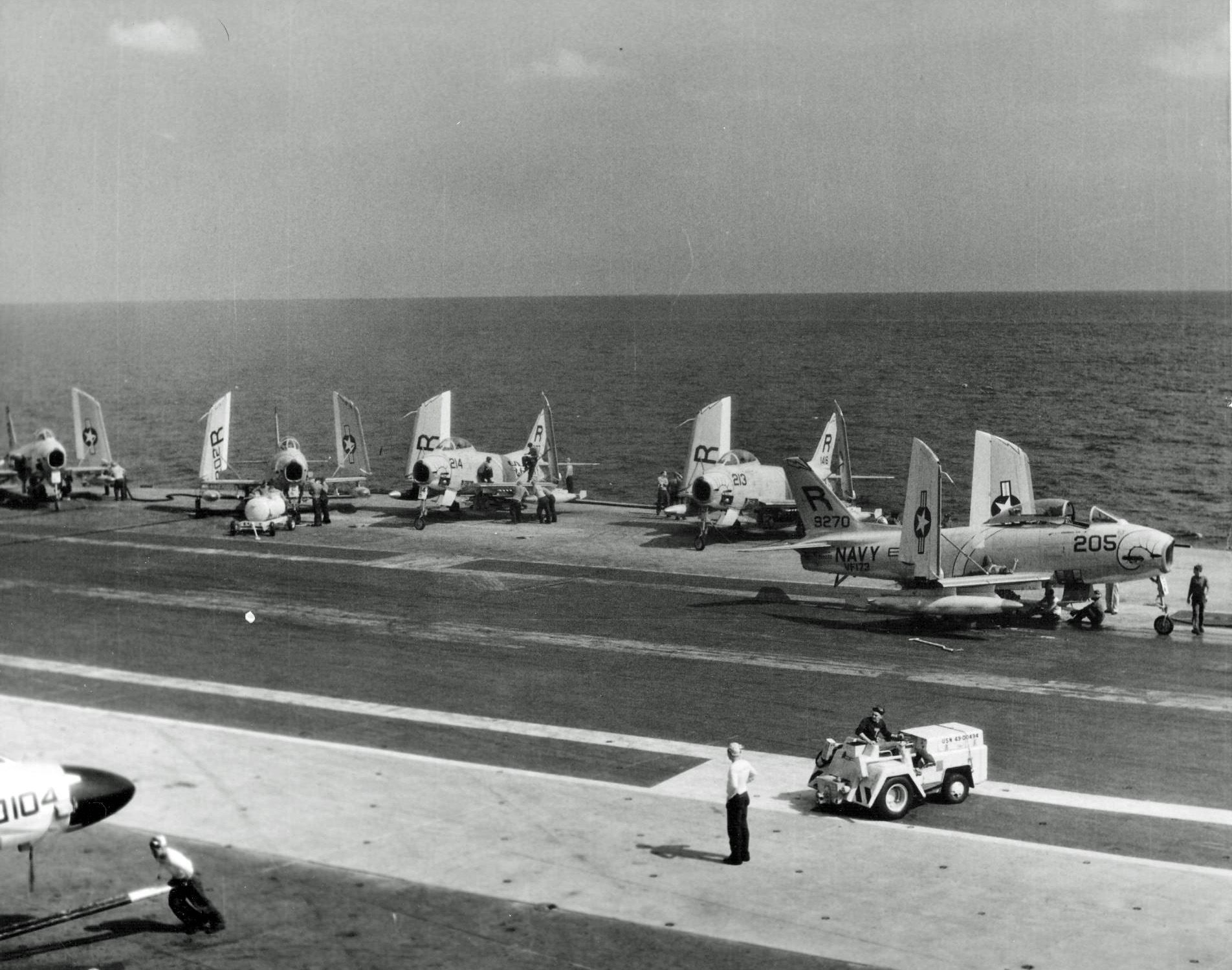
VF-173 FJ-3s aboard USS Saratoga c. 1956

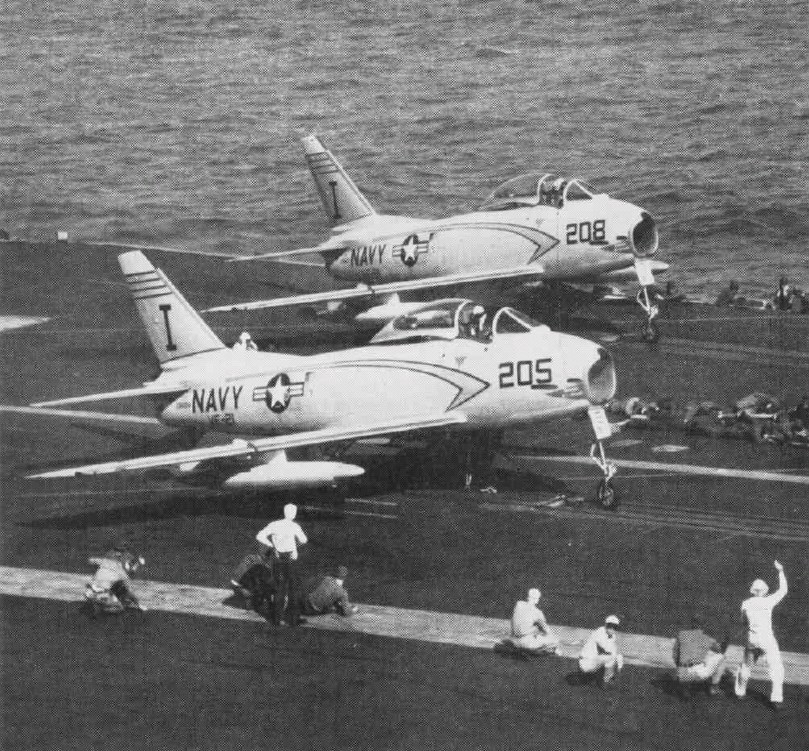
FJ-3s of VF-21 aboard USS Ranger in 1957

=== Atlantic Fleet ===
- FJ-3: VF-3, VF-33
- VF-173 based at Jacksonville, Florida, Sept. 1954
- FJ-3M: VA-172, VF-12, VF-62, VF-73, VF-84, VF-17.
- FJ-3D2: Guided Missile Squadron TWO / VU-8.

=== Pacific Fleet ===
- FJ-3: VF-24, VF-91, VF-154, VF-191, VF-211 Guided Missile Group one- GMGRU-1 Barbers Point, Oahu HI.
- FJ-3M: VF-21, VF-51, VF-121, VF-142, VF-143, VF-211.
- FJ-4B: VA-192, VA-146

=== Carriers ===
- USS Bennington on 8 May 1955
- USS Forrestal on 4 Jan. 1956, VF-21
- USS Bon Homme Richard 1957-58

== US Marine Corps units with FJ Fury ==
- VMF-122
- VMF-232
- VMF-235
- VMF-313
- VMF-323
- VMF-333
- VMF-334
- VMF-351
- VMF-451
