= VF-62 =

Fighter Squadron 62
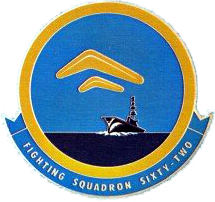
- VF-62 squadron insignia
- Active: 1 July 1955 – 1 October 1969
- Country: United States
- Branch: United States Navy
- Role: Fighter aircraft
- Part of: Inactive
- Nickname: Boomerangs

Aircraft flown
- Fighter: FJ-3M Fury; F-8A/C/E Crusader

Fighter Squadron 62 or VF-62 was an aviation unit of the United States Navy. Originally established on 1 July 1955 it was disestablished on 1 October 1969.

== Operational history ==
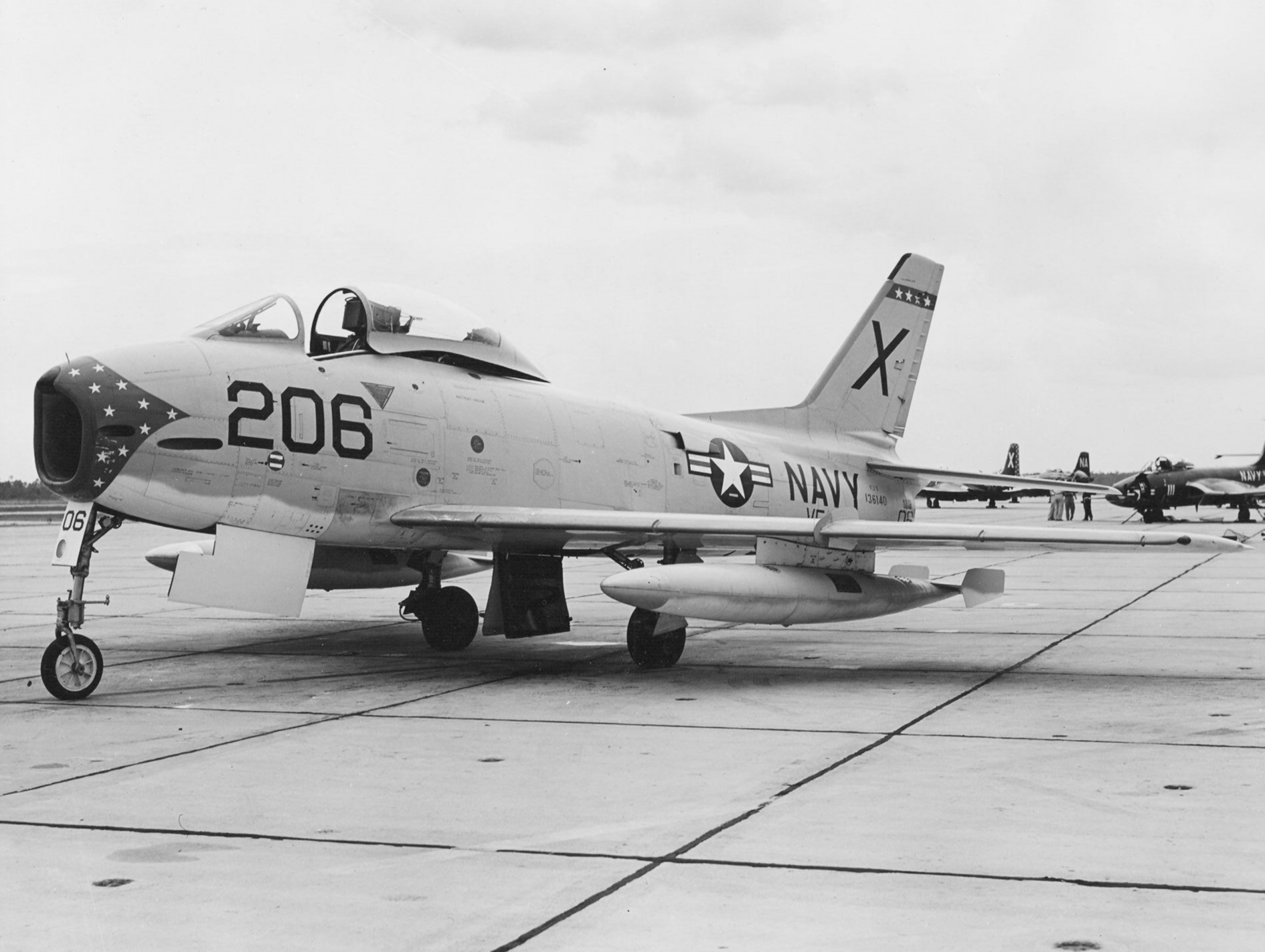
VF-62 FJ-3 at NAS Cecil Field in 1956

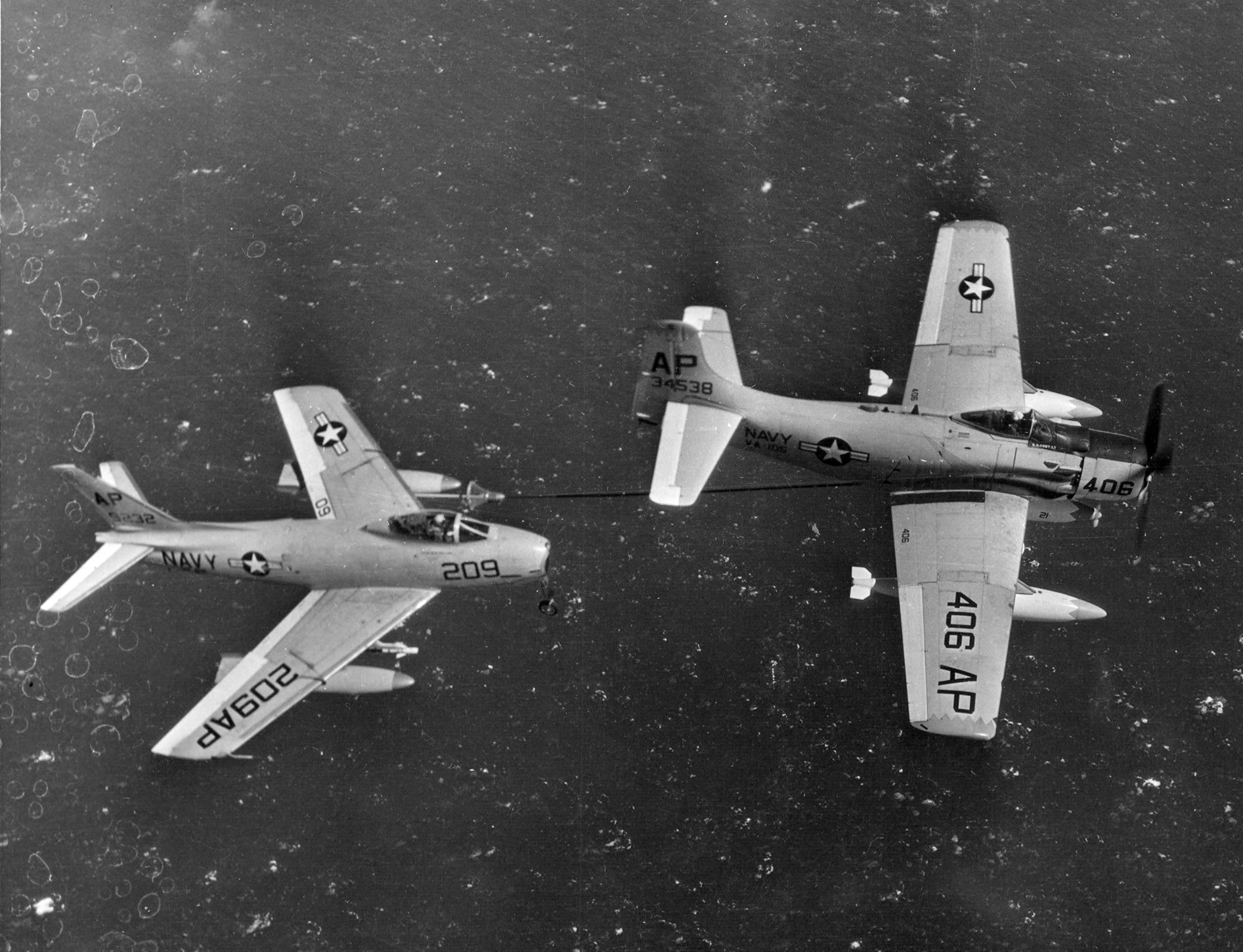
VF-62 FJ-3 refuels from a VA-105 AD-6 in 1958

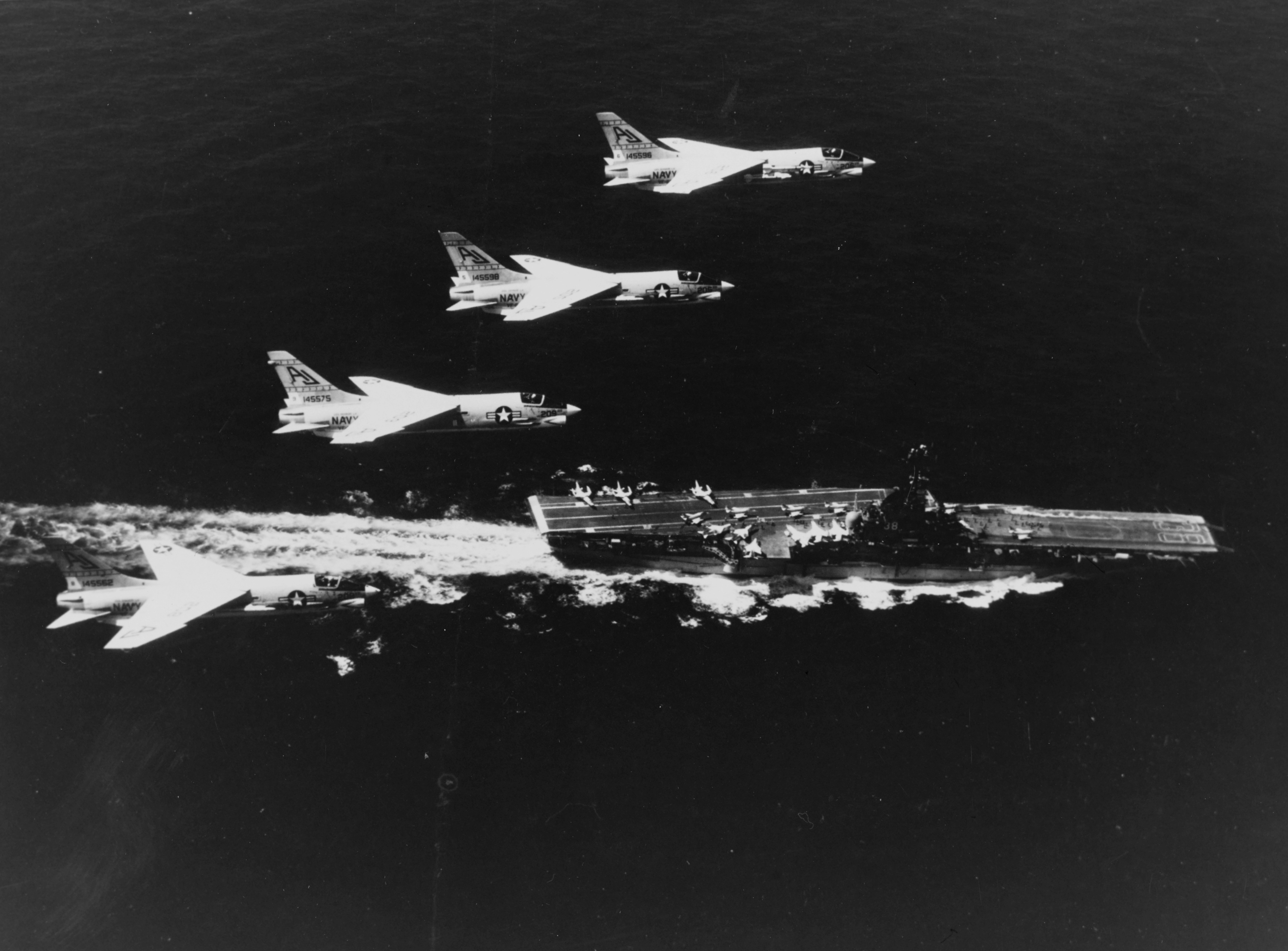
VF-62 F-8Cs fly over the USS Shangri-La in 1968

VF-62 would deploy with Air Task Group 202 (ATG-202) aboard the USS Bennington to the Mediterranean from 4 July 1956 to 19 February 1957.

VF-62 was assigned to Attack Carrier Air Wing 10 (CVW-10) aboard the USS Shangri-La for a Mediterranean deployment from 15 February to 20 September 1965.

VF-62 was assigned to Carrier Air Wing 8 (CVW-8) aboard the USS Shangri-La for a Mediterranean deployment from 15 November 1967 to 4 August 1968.

VF-62 and CVW-8 was embarked aboard the USS Shangri-La for a Caribbean deployment from October to December 1968.

== Home port assignments ==
- NAS Cecil Field

== Aircraft assignment ==
- FJ-3M Fury
- F-8A/C/E Crusader

== See also ==
- History of the United States Navy
- List of inactive United States Navy aircraft squadrons
- List of United States Navy aircraft squadrons
