= VF-73 =

Fighter Squadron 73
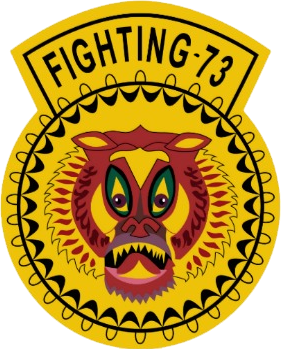
- VF-73 squadron insignia
- Active: 27 July 1948 – 1 March 1958
- Country: United States
- Branch: United States Navy
- Role: Fighter
- Part of: Inactive
- Nickname(s): Jesters

Aircraft flown
- Fighter: F8F-1/2 Bearcat; F4U-4 Corsair; F9F-5 Panther; F6F-5 Hellcat; F2H-3 Banshee; F9F-6 Cougar; FJ-3 Fury

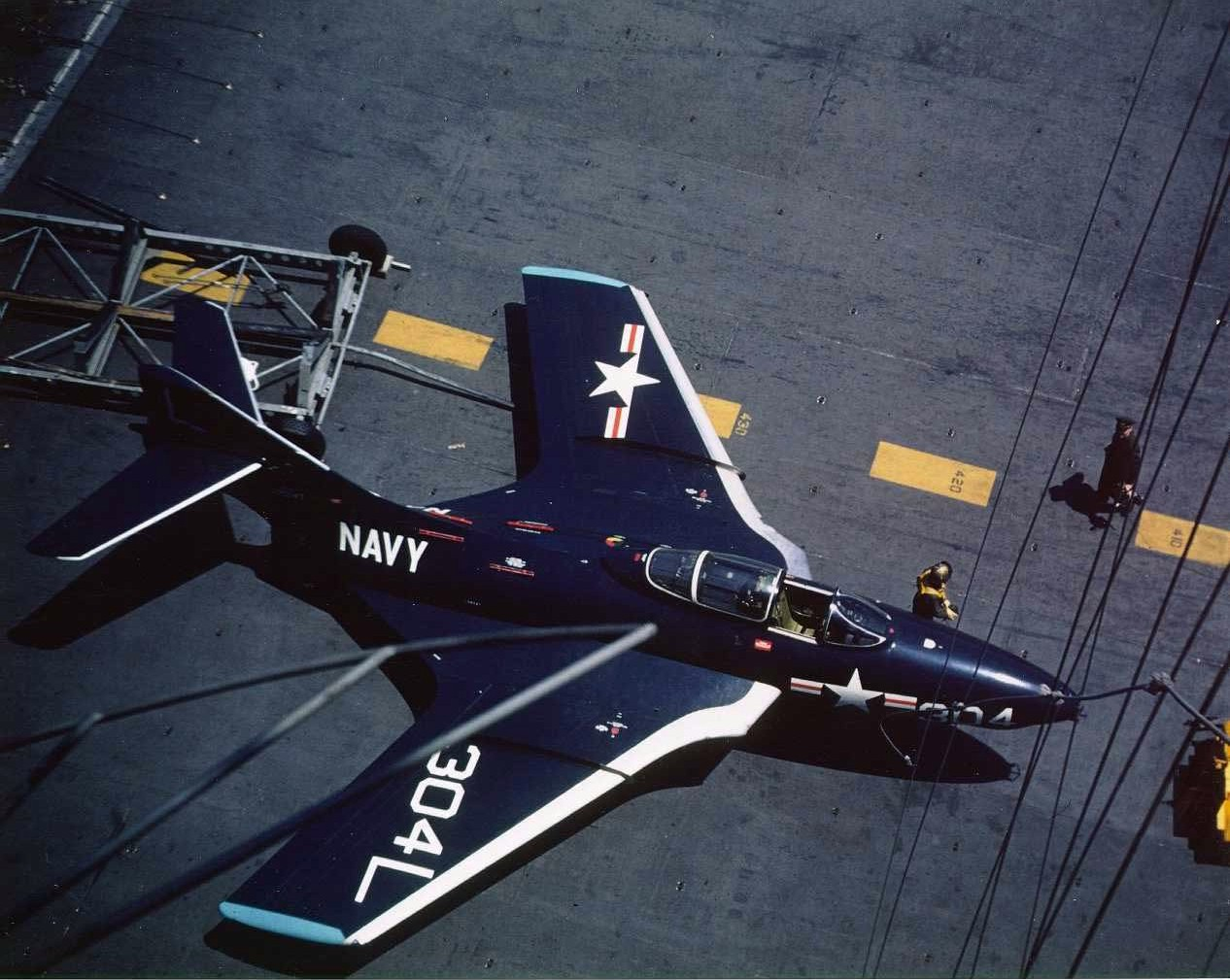
VF-73 F9F-6 Cougar on USS Midway in 1954

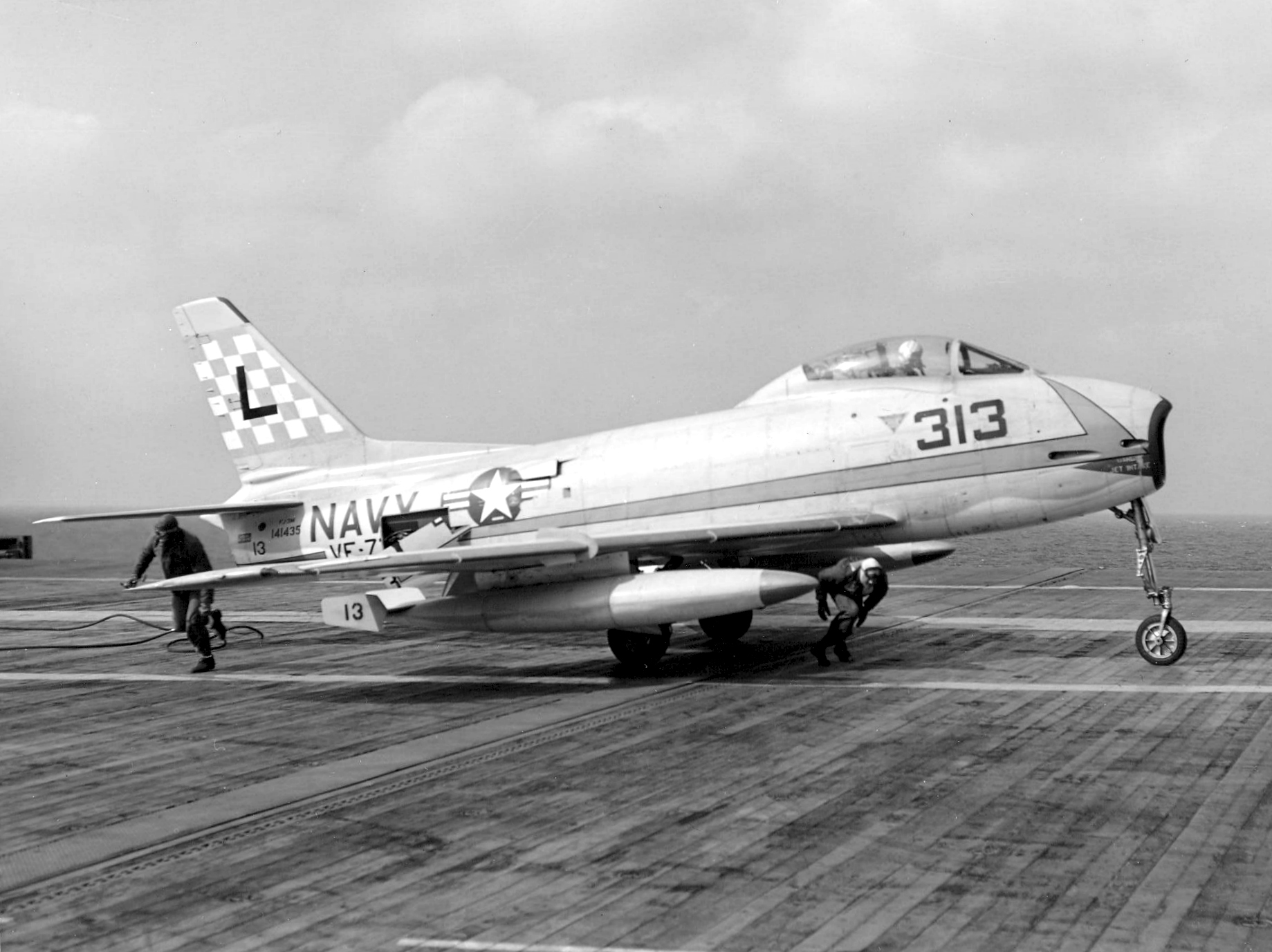
VF-73 FJ-3 prepares to launch from USS Randolph in 1957

Fighter Squadron 73 (VF-73), also known as the "Jesters", was a United States Navy fighter squadron established at Naval Air Station Quonset Point, Rhode Island on 27 July 1948, and disestablished on 1 March 1958.

== Operational history ==
While at NAS Quonset Point, VF-73 was attached to Carrier Air Group Seven and deployed to the Mediterranean with the USS Philippine Sea and USS Leyte. The cruise lasted from 4 January 1949 – 22 May 1949.

From 4 January 1954 – 4 August 1954, VF-73 again deployed to the Mediterranean while attached to Carrier Air Group Six on board the USS Midway.

In 1955, VF-73 was once again attached to Carrier Air Group Seven. On 4 May 1955, the squadron deployed to the Far East with the USS Hornet, becoming part of the Navy's Seventh Fleet. During the cruise, the Hornet helped cover the evacuation of Vietnamese from the Communist-controlled north to South Vietnam, then ranged from Japan to Formosa, Okinawa, and the Philippines in readiness training with the 7th Fleet. VF-73 returned to the United States with the Hornet on 10 December 1955.

On 1 July 1957, VF-73 deployed to the Mediterranean for the last time while attached to Carrier Air Group Four on board the USS Randolph. Between August and December 1957, as political turmoil in Syria threatened to further disturb the region, the Randolph patrolled the eastern Mediterranean. The squadron returned to the United States on 24 February 1958.

== See also ==
- Naval Aviation
- List of United States Navy aircraft squadrons
- List of Inactive United States Navy aircraft squadrons
- List of Sabre and Fury units in US military
- United States Naval Aviator
- Military Aviation
