= VF-173 =

Fighter Squadron 173
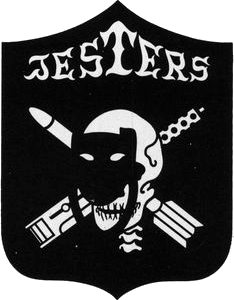
- Active: 11 August 1948 – 1 February 1959
- Country: United States
- Branch: United States Navy
- Role: Fighter aircraft
- Part of: Inactive
- Nickname: Jesters

Aircraft flown
- Fighter: F8F-2 Bearcat; F4U-5 Corsair; F9F-6 Cougar; FJ-3 Fury

Fighter Squadron 173 or VF-173 was an aviation unit of the United States Navy established on 11 August 1948 and disestablished on 1 February 1959.

== Operational history ==
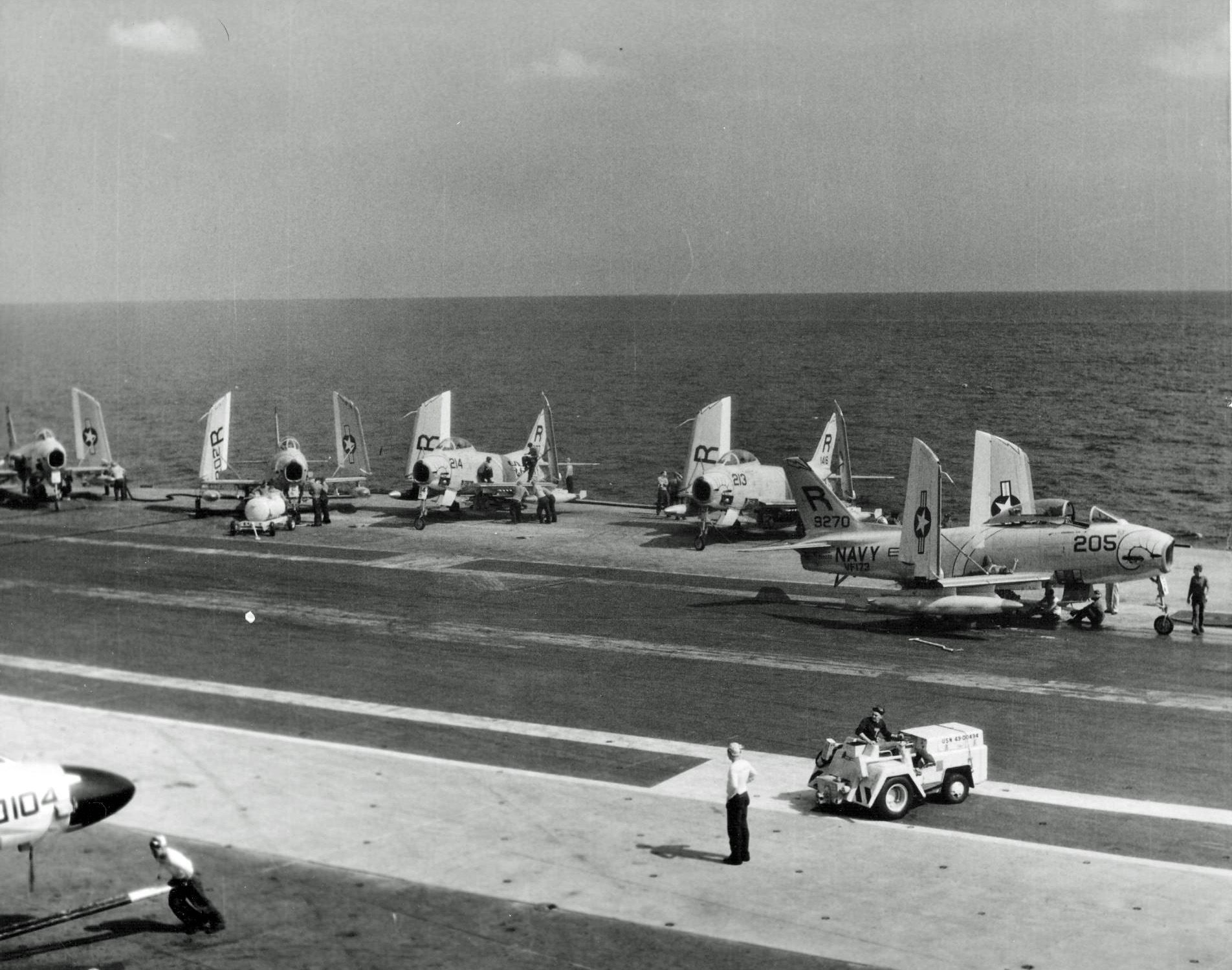
VF-173 FJ-3s on USS Saratoga c.1956

VF-173 was the first squadron equipped with the FJ-3 Fury replacing its F9F-6 Cougars in late 1954, VF-173 completed the carrier qualification of the FJ-3 aboard USS Coral Sea in early 1955.

VF-173 was assigned to Carrier Air Group 4 (CVG-4) which was assigned to the USS Randolph from June 1957 to February 1958. In September 1957, VF-173 participated in Operation Deep Water.

== Home port assignments ==
- NAS Jacksonville

== Aircraft assignment ==
- F8F-2 Bearcat
- F4U-5 Corsair
- F9F-6 Cougar
- FJ-3 Fury

== See also ==
- History of the United States Navy
- List of inactive United States Navy aircraft squadrons
- List of United States Navy aircraft squadrons
