= VF-121 =

Fighter Squadron 121
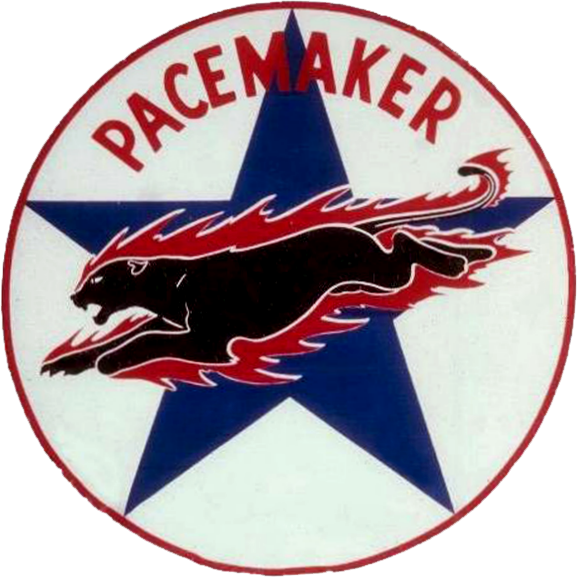
- VF-121 squadron insignia
- Active: 1 July 1946 – 30 September 1980
- Country: United States
- Branch: United States Navy
- Type: Replacement Air Group
- Role: Fighter
- Part of: Inactive
- Nickname(s): Pacemakers
- Engagements: Korean War

Aircraft flown
- Fighter: Grumman F9F-2/5 Panther; North American FJ-2/-3 Fury; Grumman F9F-6/8 Cougar; McDonnell F2H-3 Banshee; Grumman F11F-1 Tiger; Douglas F3D-2T2 Skynight; McDonnell F3H Demon; McDonnell Douglas F-4B/J/N/S Phantom

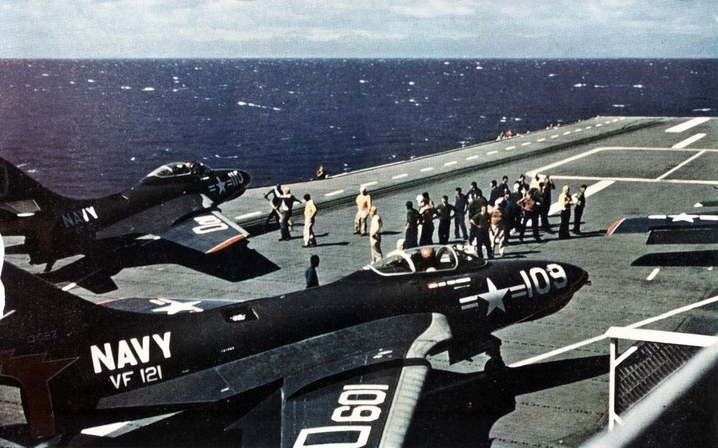
VF-121 F9F-8s launching from USS Hancock (CV-19) c. 1955

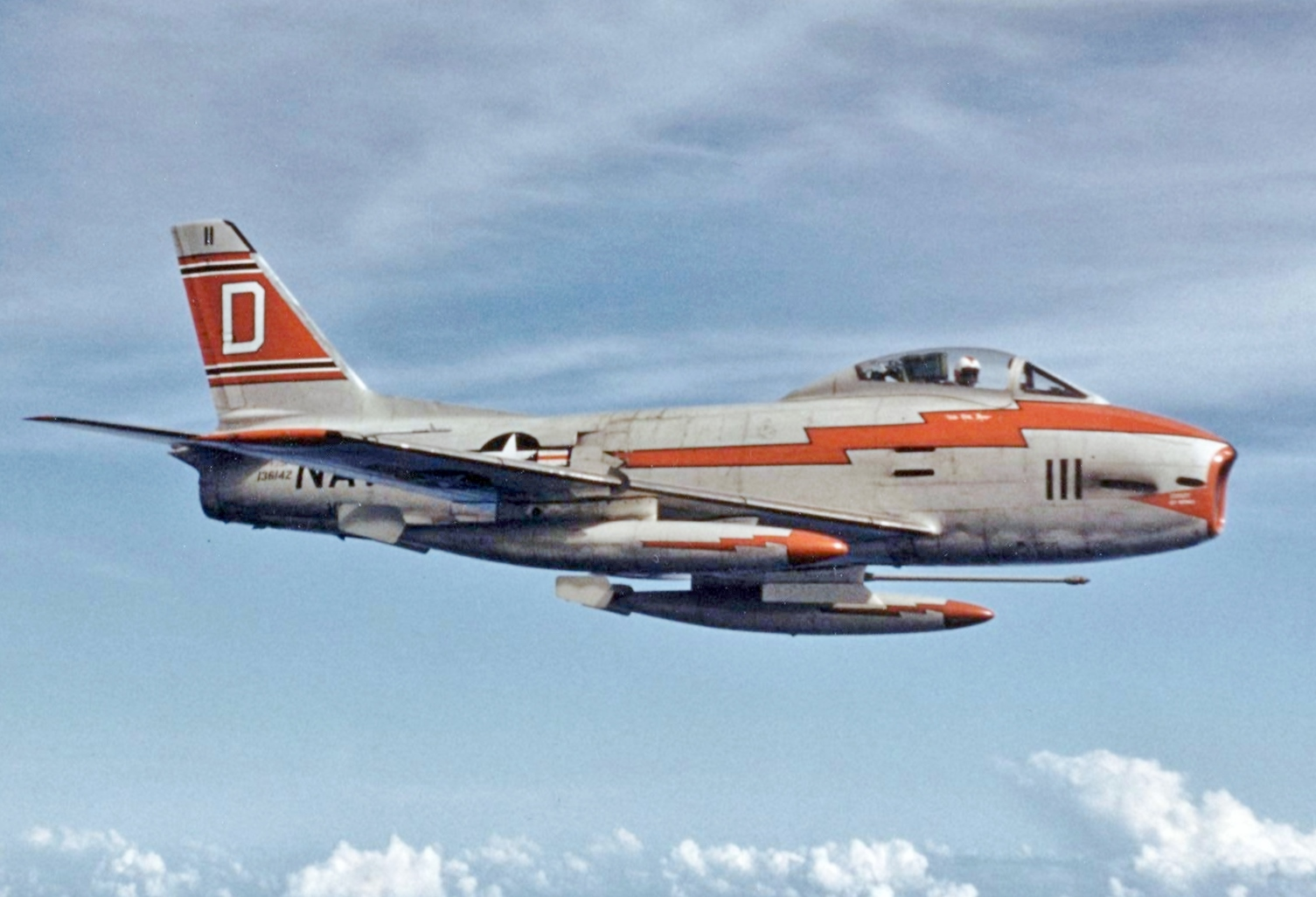
VF-121 FJ-3M in 1957

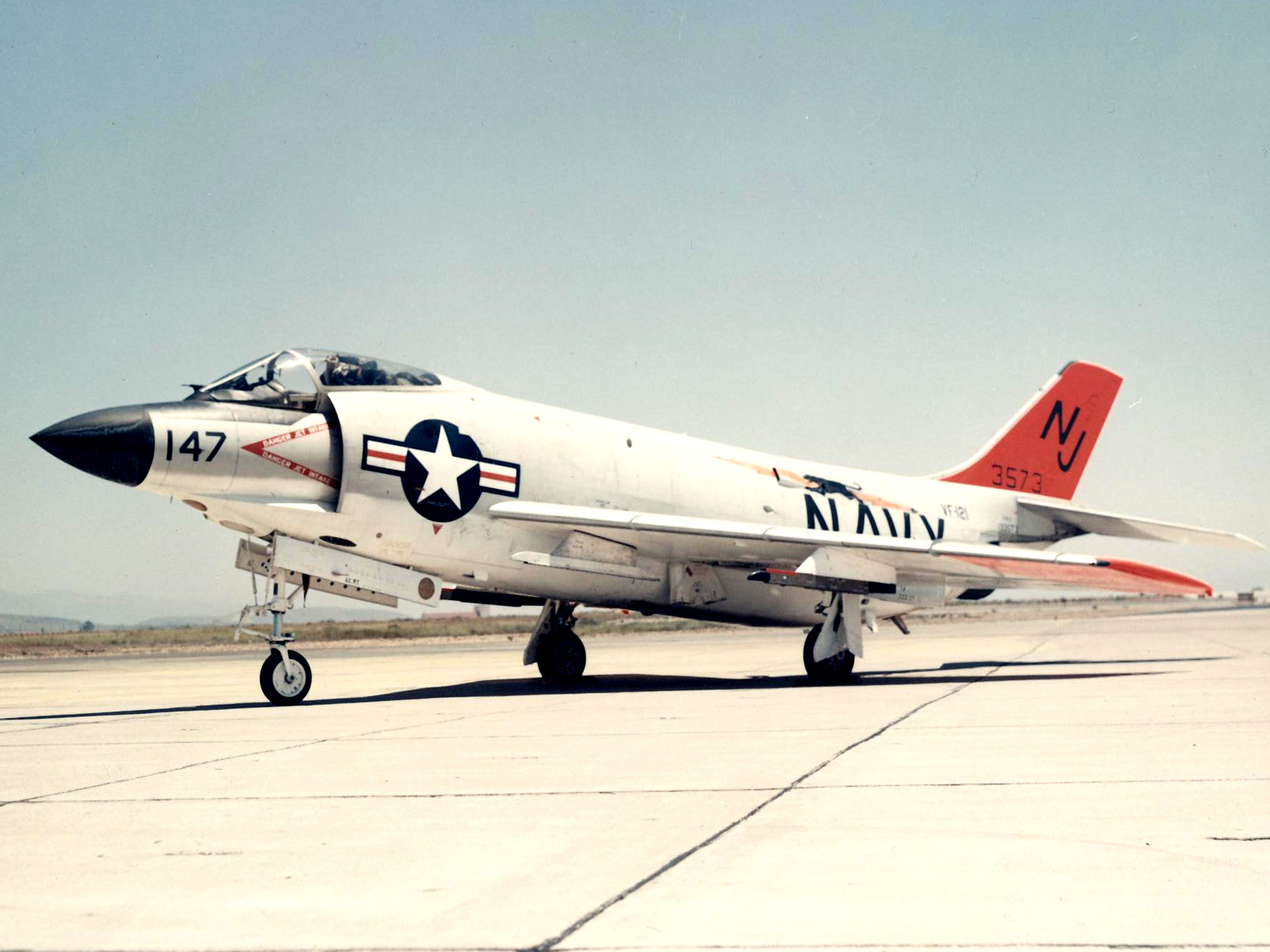
VF-121 F3H in 1956

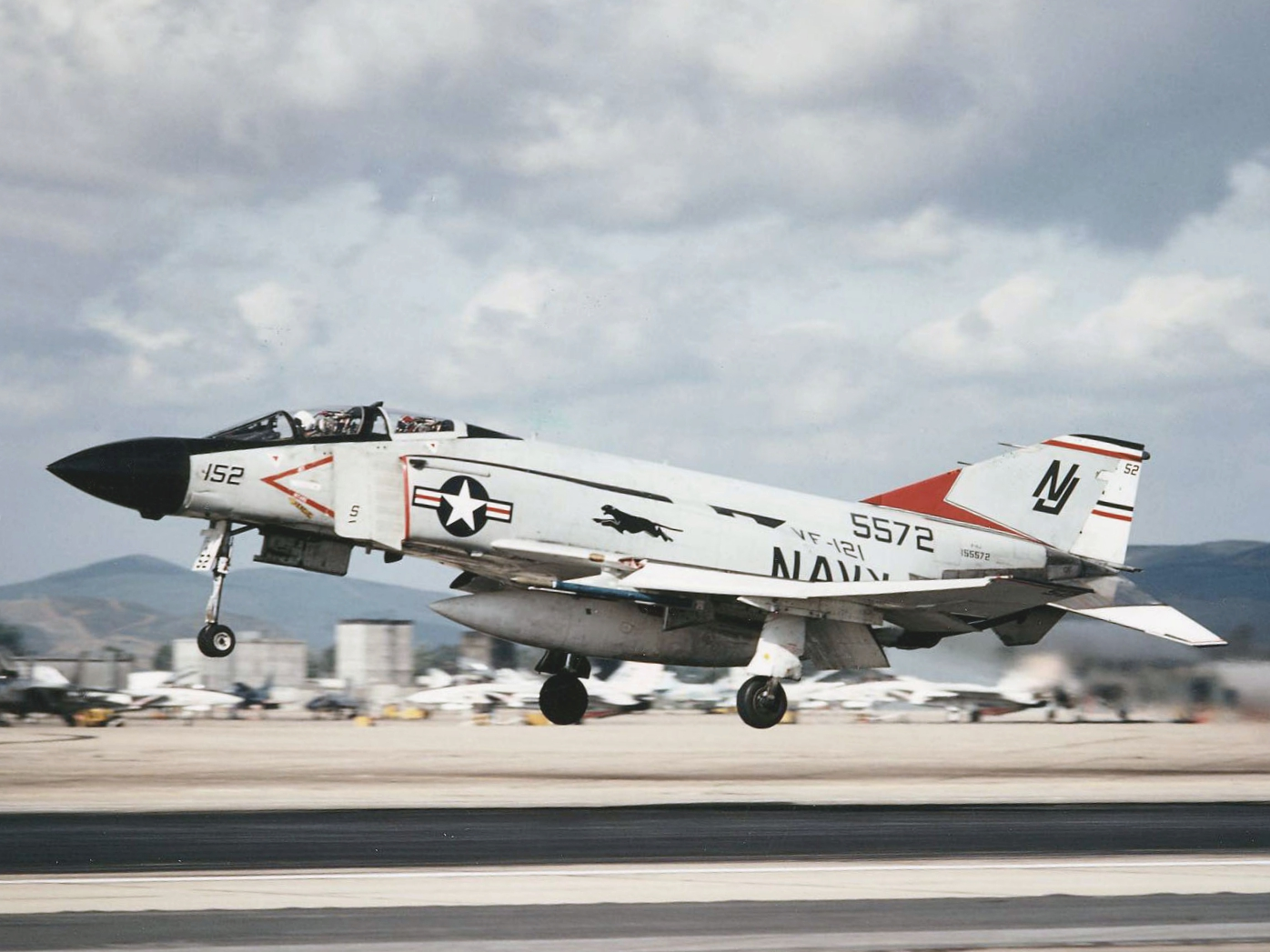
VF-121 F-4J lands at NAS Miramar in 1978

VF-121 (Fighter Squadron 121) of the United States Navy was a former Pacific Fleet Replacement Air Group (RAG) unit. Originally established on 1 July 1946, as VF-781, it was redesignated as VF-121 on 4 February 1953 and disestablished on 30 September 1980. On 11 April 1958 it changed duty from Fleet Squadron to Fleet Replacement Squadron and was later charged with the training of Navy F-4 Phantom flight and maintenance crews.

== Operational history ==
=== Fighting Squadron ===
On 1 July 1946, VF-781, The Pacemakers were stationed at Naval Air Station Los Alamitos. On 20 July 1950, VF-781 was based at NAS North Island. In January 1951 the squadron moved to NAS Miramar.

VF-781 served on board USS Bon Homme Richard with Air Group 102 (CVG-102) flying F9F-2B Panthers from 10 May to 17 December 1951. VF-781's next cruise was on board USS Oriskany flying with Air Group 102 (CVG-102) flying F9F-5's over Korea from 15 September 1952 to 18 May 1953. On 18 November 1952, VF-781 scored its first MiG-15 kills by Royce Williams, John Middleton and Rowlans by 20mm guns in the F9F-5's.

VF-781 was re-designated VF-121 on 4 February 1953. After re-designation to VF-121, the squadron transitioned to F9F-6 Cougars with commanding officer Jimmie E Savage for their 1954 western Pacific deployment with Carrier Air Group 12 (CVG-12) on the USS Boxer from 3 March to 11 October. They made another cruise with CVG-12 to the western Pacific and Korea on the USS Hancock from 10 August 1955 to 15 March 1956 flying F9F-8, with the tail code of 'D' then converted to FJ-3 Fury's. The last cruise was on board USS Lexington from 19 April to 17 October 1957.

Commander R. E. 'Dusty' Rhodes was CO of VF-121 during 1955, he was a former Commanding Officer of the Blue Angels flight team from 1947 to 1950. Rhodes worked with VC-6 and their AJ Savage tankers on air-to-air refueling. The exercise was successfully tested off the coast of San Diego.

=== Training Squadron ===
The first West Coast F4H Phantom Squadron was assigned to VF-121 at NAS Miramar. VF-121 received the first examples of F-4B Phantoms in 1961. On 24 May 1961, Project LANA – the 50th Anniversary of Naval Aviation Transcontinental Race for the Bendix Trophy, was won by a VF-121 crew. Aircrews came from other aircraft types and became qualified in the flight, navigation, and operation of the F4H Phantom. Maintainers came from other squadrons and 'A' schools to learn the Phantom as well. Gunnery and weapons training was obtained while deployed to MCAS Yuma. Carrier Field Landing Practice (FCLP). Their skills were graded by a Landing Signals Office (LSO) the same way as on a carrier. Once qualified they could advance to actual carrier day/ night launch/ recovery qualifications. After this training, the aircrews were assigned to a fleet squadron and sea duty.

=== Top Gun ===
The original United States Navy Strike Fighter Tactics Instructor program, more popularly known worldwide as Top Gun, started in March 1969 under VF-121 control.

== Home port assignments ==
The squadron was assigned to these home ports:

- NAS North Island
- NAS Miramar

== Aircraft assignment ==
- Grumman F6F Hellcat
- Chance-Vought F4U Corsair
- Grumman F9F-2/-5 Panther, tail code D
- Grumman F9F-6/-8 Cougar, tail code D
- North American FJ-3 Fury, tail code D
- McDonnell F3H Demon, tail code NJ
- Grumman F11F Tiger, tail code NJ
- McDonnell F-4B/J Phantom II, tail code NJ

== Commanding officers ==
- VF-781
  - LCDR Collin I. Overland – 1 Jul 1946 to 1952
  - LCDR Stan R. Holm – 1952 to 1954
- VF-121
  - CDR J. E. Savage – 1954
  - CDR Jereme H. 'Dusty' Rhodes – 1954 to 1956
  - CDR T. S. Sedaker – 1956 to 1957 [ Has 2 kills to credit]
  - CDR Gerald O'Rourke – 1964 to Apr 1965
  - CDR Timothy R. O'Neil – Apr 65 to 14 Mar 1966
  - CDR Scott S. Lamoreaux – 14 Mar 66 to 23 Jun 1967
  - CDR Marland W. Townsend Jr. – 23 Jun 67 to 14 Jun 1968
  - CDR Henry L. Halleland – 14 Jun 68 to 30 Sep 1969
  - CDR Richard Schulte – 30 Sep 19 to 15 Jul 1970 [Helped start Top Gun]
  - CDR Billy D. Franklin – 15 July 70 to 28 May 1971
  - CDR Donald B. Pringle – 15 May 71 to 20 Dec 1971
  - CDR James F. Dorsey Jr. – 20 Dec 71 to 22 Feb 1972
  - CDR Russell E. Davis – 22 Feb 72 to 31 Aug 1973
  - CDR Alvin S. Newman – 31 Aug 73 to 16 Dec 1974
  - CDR James F. Dorsey – 16 Dec 74 to 1975
  - CDR Dennis Brooks – 75 to 1 Jun 1976
  - CDR Chuck McGill – Jun 76 to 1977
  - CDR Frank Mezzadri – Jun 1978 to 1979
  - CDR Phillip Anselmo – 1979 to Sept 1980

== See also ==
- History of the United States Navy
- List of inactive United States Navy aircraft squadrons
- List of United States Navy aircraft squadrons
