= North American FJ-2/-3 Fury =

Carrier-capable variant of the F-86 Sabre built for the US Navy

FJ-2 / FJ-3 Fury
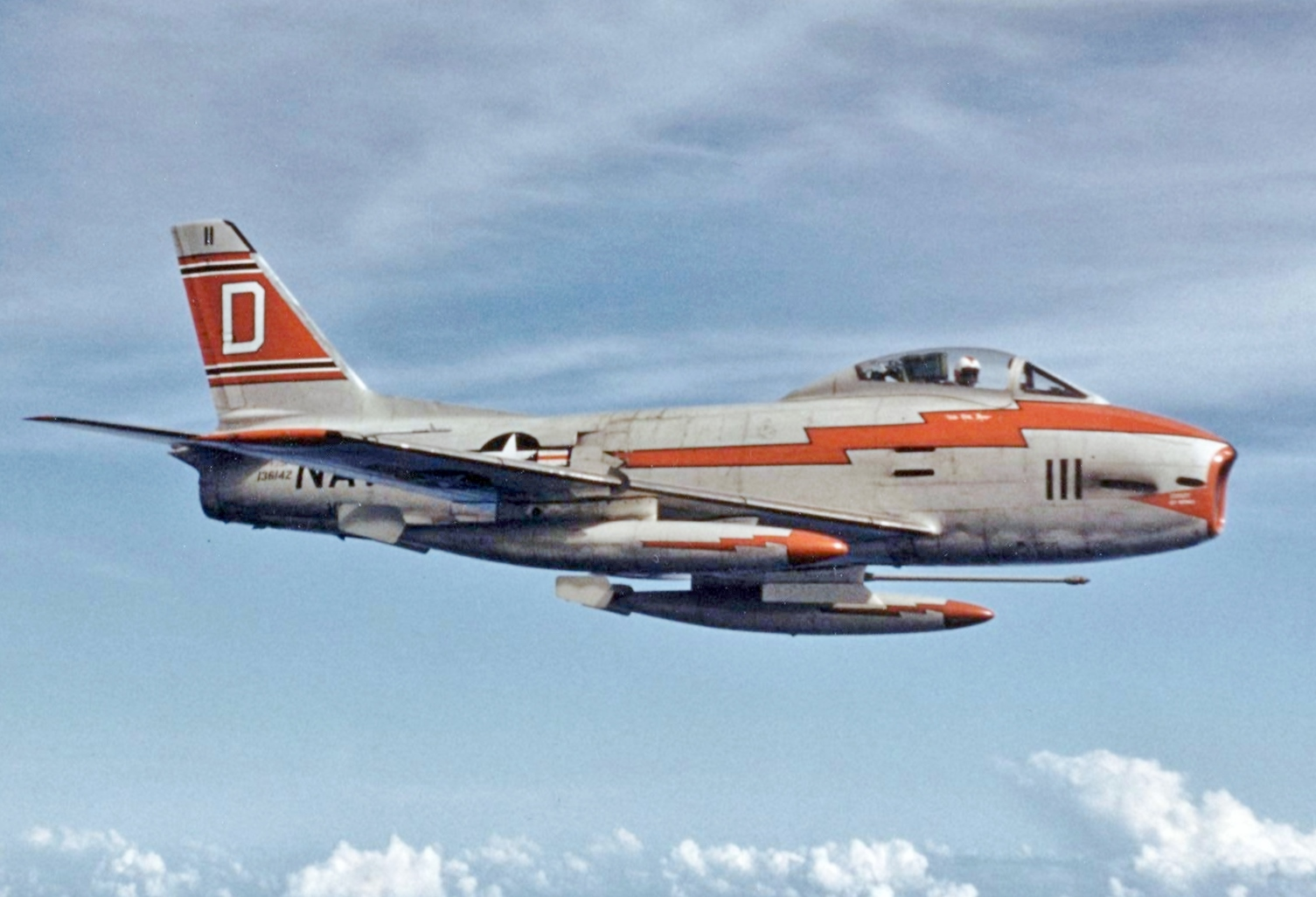
- An FJ-3M of VF-121 Pacemakers in 1957

General information
- Type: Fighter aircraft
- National origin: United States
- Manufacturer: North American Aviation
- Primary users: United States Navy United States Marine Corps
- Number built: 741

History
- Introduction date: 1954
- First flight: 27 December 1951
- Retired: September 1962
- Developed from: North American F-86 Sabre
- Developed into: North American FJ-4 Fury

The North American FJ-2 and FJ-3 Fury are a series of swept-wing and carrier-capable fighters for the United States Navy and Marine Corps. The FJ-2 resulted from an effort to navalize the North American F-86 Sabre operated by the United States Air Force. These aircraft feature folding wings, and a longer nose landing strut designed to increase angle of attack upon launch and to accommodate a longer oleo to absorb the shock of hard landings on an aircraft carrier deck.

Although sharing a U.S. Navy designation with its distant predecessor, the straight-winged North American FJ-1 Fury, the FJ-2/-3 were completely different aircraft (the later FJ-4 was again, a complete structural redesign of the FJ-3). The FJ-2 was one of the aircraft used to evaluate the first steam catapult on a US Navy aircraft-carrier.

== Design and development ==
=== FJ-2 ===
By 1951, the Navy's existing straight-wing fighters were inferior in performance to the swept-wing Soviet Mikoyan-Gurevich MiG-15 then operating in the Korean War; the swept-wing fighters in the Navy's development pipeline, such as the Douglas F4D Skyray, Grumman F9F Cougar, McDonnell F3H Demon and Vought F7U Cutlass were not yet ready for deployment.

As an interim measure, the Navy's Bureau of Aeronautics ordered a direct development of the swept-wing North American F-86E Sabres as the FJ-2. As the F-86 had not been designed to be carrier-capable, this involved some risk, but Navy pilots had observed that the F-86A actually had a lower landing speed than the Grumman F9F Panther. During carrier qualification trials the Navy informed Grumman that if the F9F-5 stall speed was not reduced by 12 mph (19 km/h) it would be removed from carrier operations at the same time that the FJ-2 was already making its debut into navy squadrons. North American's chief engineer at the time stated that the swept-wing Sabre had handling and stall characteristics at low speeds comparable to the best straight winged airplanes. The urgency behind the program was such that 300 (later reduced to 200) FJ-2 fighters were ordered before the prototypes had flown.

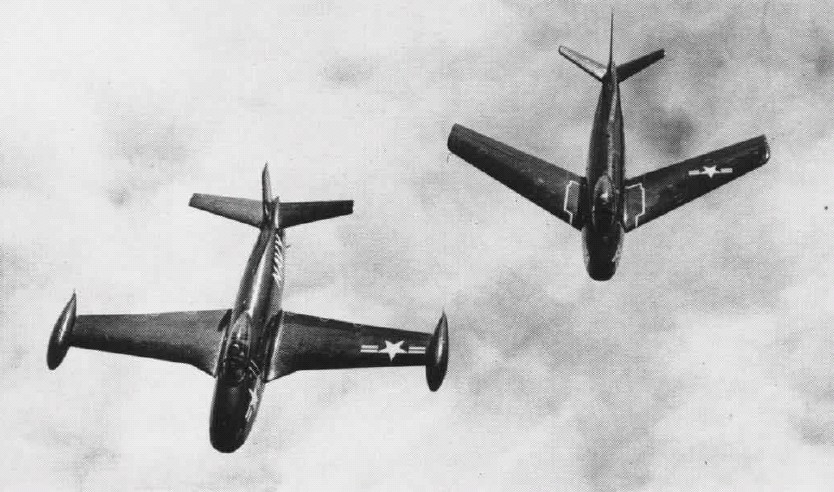
FJ-1 and FJ-2 in 1952

The first prototype to fly was actually the third aircraft ordered: Designated XFJ-2B and first flown on 27 December 1951, it differed only from a standard F-86E-10 in its armament, having four 20 mm (0.8 in) Colt Mk 12 cannons instead of the six Colt-Browning M3 .50 in (12.7 mm) machine guns of the Sabre. The second and third aircraft to fly were designated XFJ-2 and lacked armament, but were modified to be carrier-capable. They had arrester hooks and longer nosewheel legs to increase angle of attack at take-off and landing, and catapult fittings. In August 1952 carrier trials were flown on USS Midway, followed by carrier qualification trials on USS Coral Sea in October–December 1952. Results were less than satisfactory: Low-speed handling was poor, while the arrester hook and nose gear leg weren't strong enough.

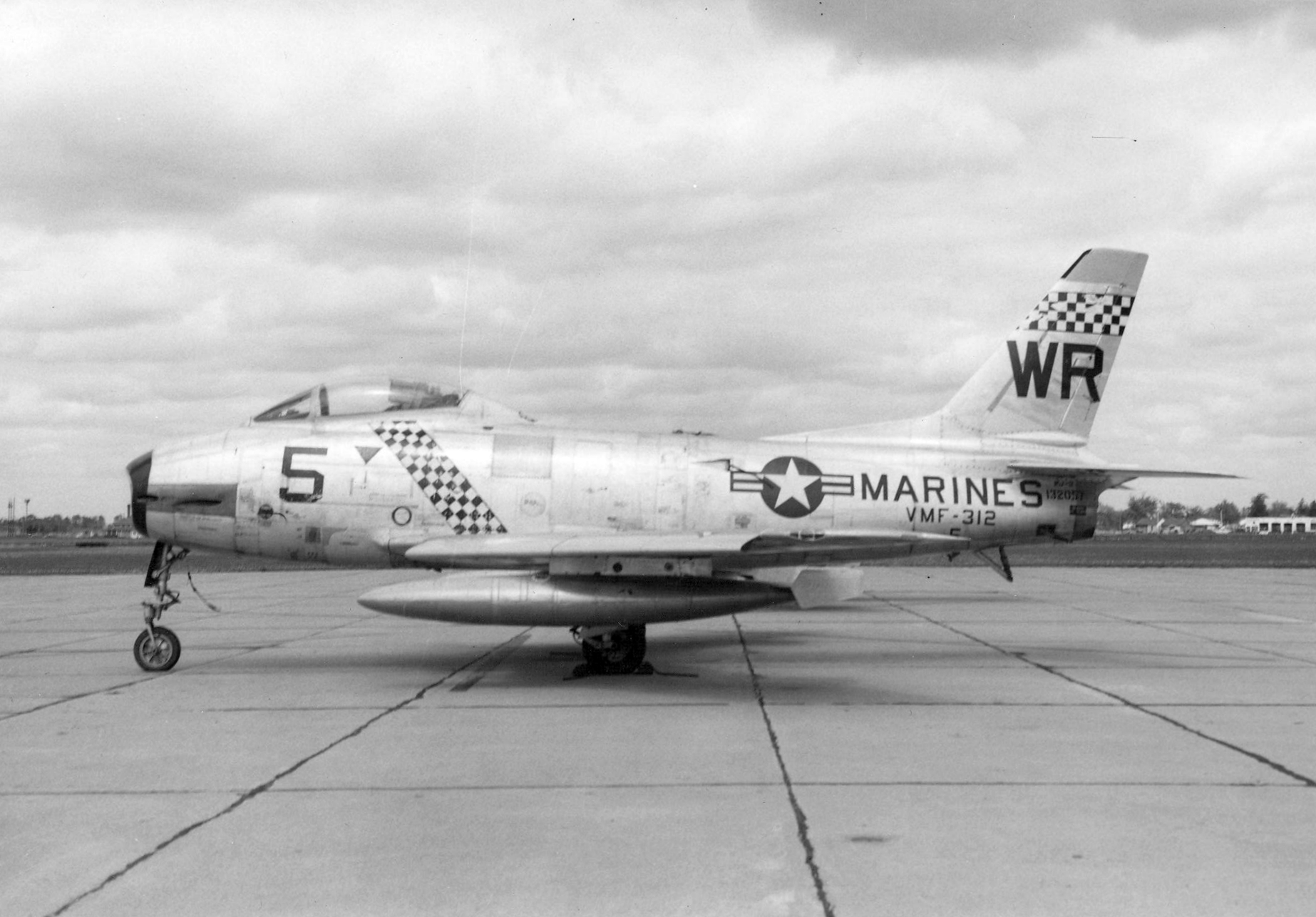
Marine corps FJ-2 of the VMF-312 Checkerboards

The first production aircraft flew on 22 November 1952. This FJ-2 incorporated further modifications for carrier operations: The track of the main landing gear was widened by eight inches, the outer wing panels folded upward, and the windscreen was modified to give the pilot a better view during approach. The FJ-2 also featured an all-moving "flying tail" without dihedral. Because of problems experienced during launches with steam catapults, a number of FJ-2 later received a stronger nosewheel strut. Outwardly, the FJ-2 was hard to distinguish from an F-86, apart from navy paint and the gun muzzles of the 20 mm (0.8 in) cannons. The engine was the General Electric J47-GE-2, a navalized version of the J47-GE-27 used in the F-86F. The naval modifications of the FJ-2 had increased weight by about 1,100 lb (500 kg) over the F-86F, but had not succeeded in delivering a fully carrier-capable fighter. A decision had already been made to give it to land-based squadrons of the US Marine Corps.

Construction was slowed due to demand for the F-86 in Korea; the FJ-2 was not produced in large numbers until after that conflict had concluded. Only seven aircraft had been delivered by the end of 1953, and it was January 1954 before the first aircraft was delivered to a United States Marine Corps squadron, VMF-122. The Navy preferred the lighter F9F Cougar due to its superior slow-speed performance for carrier operations, and the 200 FJ-2 models built were delivered to the Marines. The Marines did make several cruises aboard carriers and tried to solve the type's carrier handling problems, but the FJ-2 was never really satisfactory. In 1956, the FJ-2 already disappeared from front-line service, and reserve units retired it in 1957.

=== FJ-3 ===
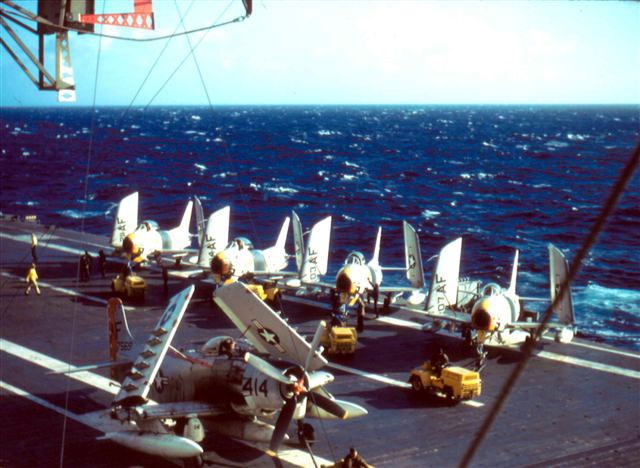
4 FJ-3 Fury fighter-bombers of VF-33 and an AD-6 of VA-25 on the deck of USS Intrepid in the North Atlantic in 1957

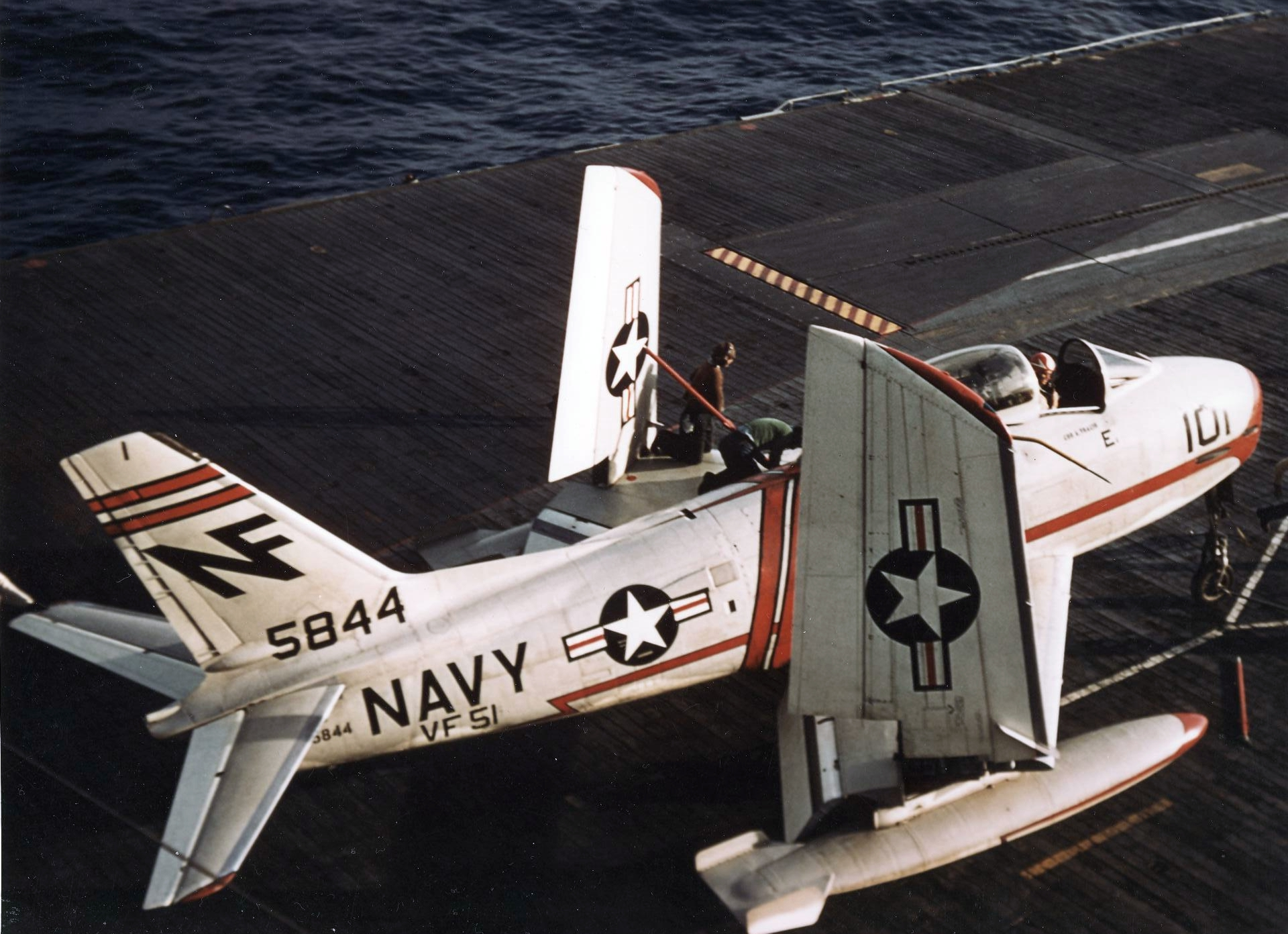
A VF-51 Fury aboard USS Bon Homme Richard in 1957

Even while development of the FJ-2 was ongoing, the development was planned of a version powered by the Wright J65, a license-built version of the British Armstrong Siddeley Sapphire turbojet. The Sapphire promised to deliver 28% more thrust than the J47, for little gain in weight. The new version was designated FJ-3, and an order for 389 aircraft was placed in March 1952.

To test the new engine a single FJ-2, BuNo 131931, was modified, but the first true production FJ-3 flew on 3 July 1953. The only externally visible change required by the new engine was a deeper intake to accommodate the larger mass flow. Early FJ-3s had the same wing as the FJ-2, but from 1955 onwards the FJ-3 was built with a so-called "6-3" wing, with a leading edge that was extended 6 in (150 mm) at the root and 3 in (76 mm) at the tip. This modification, first introduced on the F-86F, enhanced maneuverability at the expense of a small increase in landing speed due to deletion of the leading edge slats. The version introduced on the FJ-3 was different from that fitted to the F-86F, as camber was applied to the underside of the leading edge to improve low-speed handling. On the FJ-3, the new wing leading edges also held extra fuel. From the 345th aircraft onwards, the wings were provided with four stations for external loads, up to 1,000 lb (450 kg) on the inboard stations and 500 lb (230 kg) on the outboard stations.

Deliveries began in September 1954, and the FJ-3 joined the fleet in May 1955. An FJ-3 was the first fighter to land aboard the new supercarrier USS Forrestal in 1956. Problems were encountered with the J65 engine, including failures of its lubrication system under the acceleration of launch or during manoeuvres, and failures of the turbine blades. Nevertheless, the Navy was more satisfied with the FJ-3 than it had been with the FJ-2, and in March 1954 ordered an additional 149 aircraft. Because of its more powerful engine, the FJ-3 was superior to most models of the F-86, except the F-86H. A total of 538 FJ-3s were built. Of these 194 were modified to FJ-3Ms with the ability to carry AIM-9 Sidewinder air-to-air missiles. Some FJ-3s were later modified to control Regulus missiles (KDU-1), and Grumman F9F-6K Cougar target drones. In 1956 the Navy retro-fitted all its FJ-3s with probe-and-drogue air refueling equipment, a long probe being fitted under the left wing.

== Variants ==
Family tree of Sabre & Fury variants

XFJ-2
Test and evaluation aircraft; three built.
FJ-2 Fury
Single-seat fighter-bomber aircraft, equipped with folding wings; powered by one General Electric J47-GE-2 turbojet; 200 built.
FJ-3 Fury (after 1962 F-1C)
Single-seat fighter-bomber version, powered by the more powerful 7,800 lbf (34,696.13 N) Wright J65-W-2 or 7,650 lbf (34,028.90 N) J65-W-4 turbojet engine; 538 built.
FJ-3M Fury (after 1962 MF-1C)
Improved version of the FJ-3, with the ability to carry AIM-9 Sidewinder air-to-air missiles; 194 FJ-3 converted to this standard.
FJ-3D (after 1962 DF-1C)
conversions to control aircraft for SSM-N-8 Regulus missiles and KDU target drones.
FJ-3D2 (after 1962 DF-1D)
conversions to control aircraft for Grumman F9F-6K Cougar target drones.

== Operators ==
United States

- United States Navy
- United States Marine Corps

== Aircraft on display ==
FJ-2

- BuNo 132023 – National Naval Aviation Museum, NAS Pensacola, Florida.
- BuNo 132057 – USS Hornet Museum, Alameda, California.

FJ-3

- BuNo 135841 – Marine Corps Air Station Beaufort, South Carolina.
- BuNo 135867 – Planes of Fame Air Museum in Chino, California.
- BuNo 135868 – Intrepid Sea, Air & Space Museum in New York, New York.
- BuNo 135883 – USS Midway Museum in San Diego, California.
- BuNo 136032 – Middleton Field in Evergreen, Alabama.
- BuNo 136119 - Evergreen Aviation and Space Museum in McMinnville, Oregon.

FJ-3M

- BuNo 141393 – Hickory Aviation Museum in Hickory, North Carolina.

== Specifications (FJ-2) ==
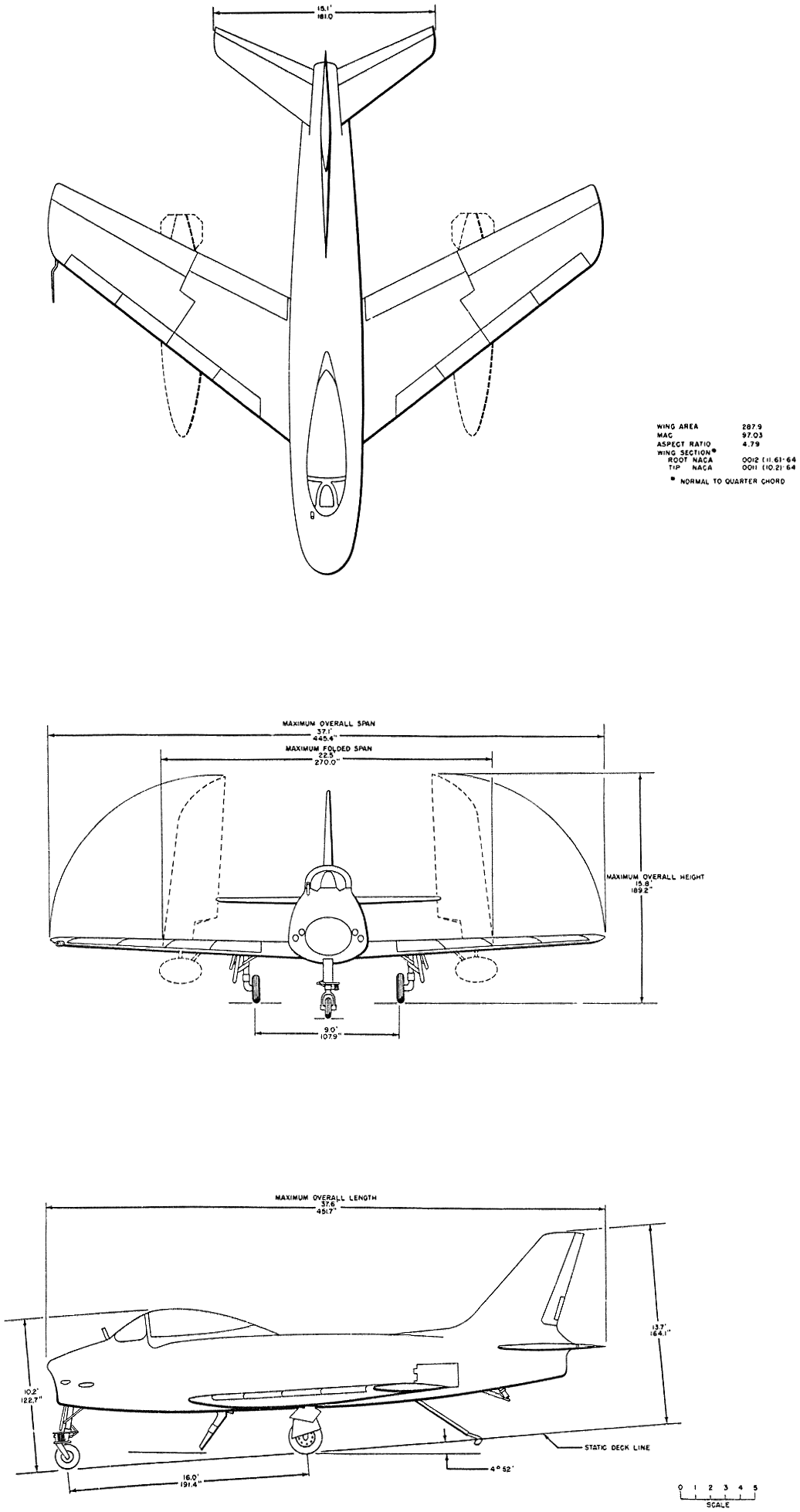
3-view line drawing of the North American FJ-2 Fury

Data from Combat Aircraft since 1945

General characteristics

- Crew: 1
- Length: 37 ft 7 in (11.46 m)
- Wingspan: 37 ft 1.5 in (11.316 m)
- Height: 13 ft 7 in (4.14 m)
- Wing area: 288 sq ft (26.8 m^{2})
- Empty weight: 11,802 lb (5,353 kg)
- Max takeoff weight: 18,790 lb (8,523 kg)
- Powerplant: 1 × General Electric J47-GE-2 turbojet engine, 6,000 lbf (27 kN) thrust

Performance

- Maximum speed: 675 mph (1,086 km/h, 587 kn) at sea level
- Range: 860 mi (1,380 km, 750 nmi) normal
- Service ceiling: 46,800 ft (14,300 m)
- Rate of climb: 7,230 ft/min (36.7 m/s)

Armament

- Guns: 4 × 20 mm (0.787 in) Colt Mk 12 cannon with 150 rpg.

== See also ==
Related development

- North American FJ-1 Fury
- North American F-86 Sabre
- North American FJ-4 Fury

Aircraft of comparable role, configuration, and era

- CAC Sabre
- Canadair Sabre
- Dassault Mystère
- Grumman F-9 Cougar
- Mikoyan-Gurevich MiG-15
- Republic F-84F Thunderstreak
- Supermarine Swift

Related lists

- List of fighter aircraft
- List of military aircraft of the United States
- List of Sabre and Fury units in US military
