= Lockheed XF-104 Starfighter =

Experimental fighter aircraft

XF-104 Starfighter
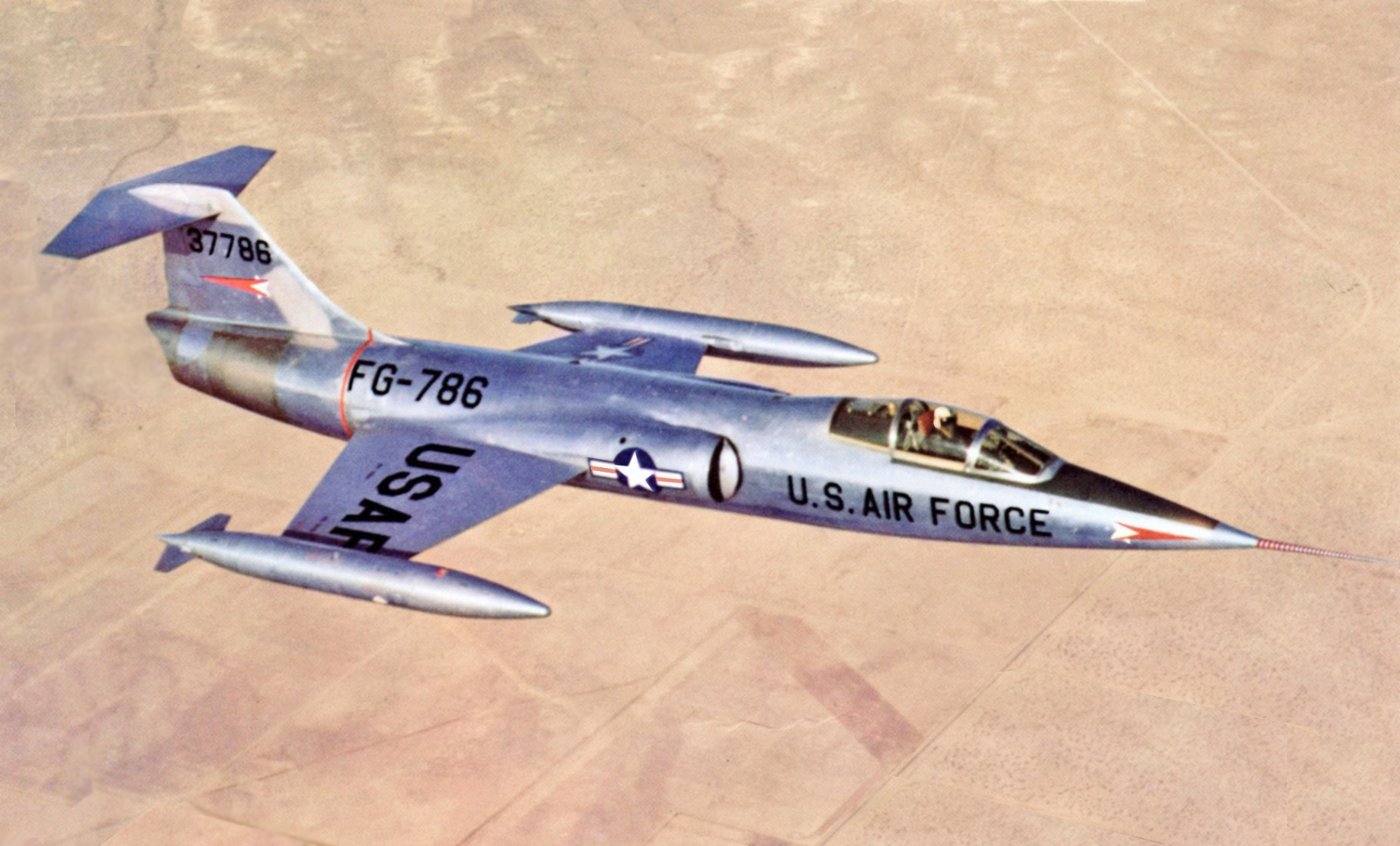
- First prototype XF-104 53-7786

General information
- Type: Interceptor prototype
- Manufacturer: Lockheed Corporation
- Designer: Clarence L. "Kelly" Johnson
- Number built: 2

History
- First flight: 4 March 1954
- Variants: Lockheed F-104 Starfighter; Lockheed NF-104A; Canadair CF-104; Aeritalia F-104S; CL-1200 Lancer/X-27

The Lockheed XF-104 Starfighter was a single-engine, high-performance, supersonic interceptor prototype for a United States Air Force (USAF) series of lightweight and simple fighters. Only two aircraft were built; one aircraft was used primarily for aerodynamic research and the other served as an armament testbed, both aircraft being destroyed in accidents during testing. The XF-104s were forerunners of over 2,500 production Lockheed F-104 Starfighters.

During the Korean War, USAF fighter pilots were outclassed by MiG-equipped Soviet pilots. Lockheed engineers, led by Kelly Johnson, designed and submitted a novel design to the Air Force, notable for its sleekness, particularly its thin wings and missile-shaped fuselage, as well as a novel pilot ejection system.

Flight testing of the XF-104s began with the first flight in March 1954, encountering several problems, some of which were resolved; however, performance of the XF-104 proved better than estimates and despite both prototypes being lost through accidents, the USAF ordered 17 service-test/pre-production YF-104As. Production Starfighters proved popular, both with the USAF and internationally, serving with a number of countries, including Jordan, Turkey, and Japan.

== Development ==
=== Original requirement ===
Clarence L. "Kelly" Johnson, chief engineer at Lockheed's Skunk Works, visited Korea in December 1951 and talked to fighter pilots about what sort of aircraft they wanted. At the time, U.S. Air Force pilots were confronting the MiG-15 "Fagot" in their North American F-86 Sabres, and many of the pilots felt that the MiGs were superior to the larger and more complex American design. The pilots requested a small and simple aircraft with excellent performance. One pilot in particular, Colonel Gabby Gabreski was quoted as saying; "I'd rather sight with a piece of chewing gum stuck on the windscreen" and told Johnson that radar "was a waste of time".

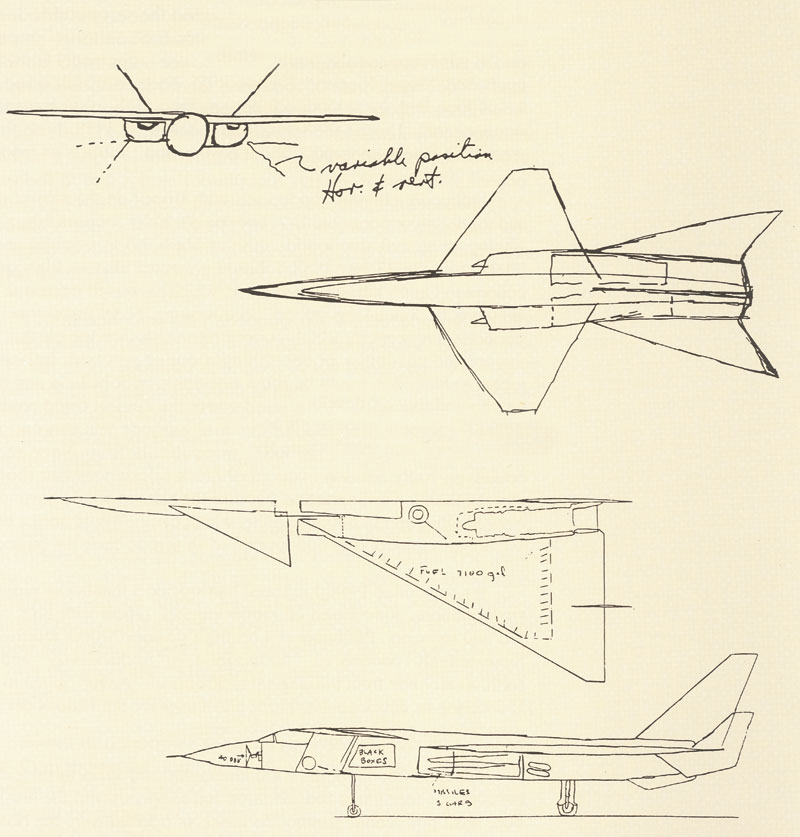
An original Johnson sketch

On his return to the U.S., Johnson immediately started the design of just such an aircraft realising that an official requirement would soon be published. In March 1952, his team was assembled, and they sketched several different aircraft proposals, ranging from small designs at 8,000 lb (3.6 t), to fairly large ones at 50,000 lb (23 t). The L-246 as the design became known remained essentially identical to the "Model L-083 Starfighter" as eventually delivered.

=== Tender of performance ===
The design was presented to the Air Force in November 1952, who were interested enough to create a new proposal, inviting several companies to participate. Three additional designs were received: the Republic AP-55, an improved version of its prototype XF-91 Thunderceptor; the North American NA-212, which would eventually evolve into the F-107; and the Northrop N-102 Fang, a new General Electric J79-powered design.

=== Selected design ===
Although all were interesting, Lockheed had an insurmountable lead and was granted a development contract in March 1953. Test data from the earlier Lockheed X-7 unmanned ramjet/rocket program proved invaluable for aerodynamic research since the XF-104 would share the general design of the X-7's wing and tail. Experience gained from the Douglas X-3 Stiletto was also used in the design phase of the XF-104. Over 400 surplus instrumented artillery rockets were launched to test various airfoils and tail designs; from which the camera film and telemetry were recovered by parachute.

=== Prototypes ===
The wooden mock-up was ready for inspection at the end of April, and work started on two prototypes late in May. The J79 engine was not yet ready, so both prototypes were instead designed to use the Wright J65, a licensed built version of the Armstrong Siddeley Sapphire. Construction of the first prototype XF-104 (US serial number 53-7786, Buzz number FG-786) began in summer 1953 at Lockheed's Burbank, California factory. This aircraft was powered by a non-afterburning Buick-built Wright J65-B-3 turbojet. The first prototype was completed by early 1954, and started flying in March. The total time from award of the contract to first flight was only one year, a very short time even then, and unheard of today, when 10–15 years is more typical. Construction of the second prototype (s/n 53-7787) proceeded at a slower pace.

=== F-104 production ===
Official approval of the XF-104 design led to a contract for 17 YF-104A service test aircraft and a production run of over 2,500 aircraft built both in the United States and under license worldwide.

Visible changes from the XF-104 to production versions of the Starfighter include a longer fuselage (to accommodate the J79 engine and extra internal fuel) and a forward-retracting nose landing gear (except two-seat versions) to increase clearance for the downward-ejecting seat. A ventral fin for increased stability was added during the YF-104A test program. Inlet shock cones and a fuselage spine fairing between the canopy and fin that housed fuel piping were further added features. Production aircraft would also feature a redesigned fin structure using stainless steel spars to eliminate the flutter problem. Since the internal fuel capacity was low limiting the useful range of the aircraft, extra capacity was provided on later versions by lengthening the forward fuselage.

== Design ==
In order to achieve the desired performance, Lockheed chose a minimalist approach: a design that would achieve high performance by wrapping the lightest, most aerodynamically efficient airframe possible around a single powerful engine. The emphasis was on minimizing drag and mass.

=== Wing design ===
The XF-104 had a radical wing design. Most supersonic jets use a swept or delta wing. This allows a reasonable balance between aerodynamic performance, lift, and internal space for fuel and equipment. However the most efficient shape for high-speed, supersonic flight had been found to be a small, straight, mid-mounted, trapezoidal wing of low aspect ratio and high wing loading. The wing was extremely thin, with a thickness-to-chord ratio of only 3.4%. The leading edges of the wing were so thin (0.016 in/0.41 mm) and so sharp that they presented a hazard to ground crews, and protective guards had to be installed during ground operations. The thinness of the wings meant that fuel tanks and landing gear had to be contained in the fuselage. The hydraulic actuators driving the ailerons were only one inch (25 mm) thick to fit into the available space and were known as Piccolo actuators because of their resemblance to this musical instrument. The wings had electrically driven leading and trailing edge flaps to increase lift at low speed. The XF-104 did not feature the Boundary Layer Control System of the production aircraft.

Wooden mock-up

=== Tail fin ===
After extensive wind tunnel testing, the stabilator was mounted at the top of the fin for optimum stability and control about the pitch axis. Because the vertical tail fin was only slightly shorter than the length of each wing and nearly as aerodynamically effective, it could act as a wing on rudder application (a phenomenon known as "Dutch roll"). To offset this effect, the wings were angled downward to give 10° anhedral. The rudder was manually operated and supplemented by a small yaw damper surface mounted at the bottom of the fin.

=== Fuselage ===
The fuselage of the XF-104 had a high fineness ratio, i.e., tapering sharply towards the nose, and a small frontal area of 25 sq ft (2.3 m^{2}). The fuselage was tightly packed, containing the cockpit, avionics, cannon, all internal fuel, landing gear, and engine. The air intakes, designed by Ben Rich, were of fixed geometry without inlet cones, since the J65-powered aircraft was incapable of Mach 2 performance. They were similar to those of the F-94 Starfire, being mounted slightly away from the fuselage, with an inner splitter plate for the boundary layer bleed air. The combination of these features provided extremely low drag except at high angle of attack, at which point induced drag became very high.

=== Ejection seat ===
The XF-104 featured an unusual downward-ejecting Stanley B seat. It was feared that contemporary ejection seat designs would not have enough explosive power to clear the high "T" tail assembly. In the event of the seat not firing, it was possible to manually release the lower fuselage hatch and then exit the aircraft via gravity. The F-104 series aircraft would later convert to upward-ejecting seats but the fuselage hatch was retained as a useful maintenance feature.

== Operational history ==
=== Testing and evaluation ===
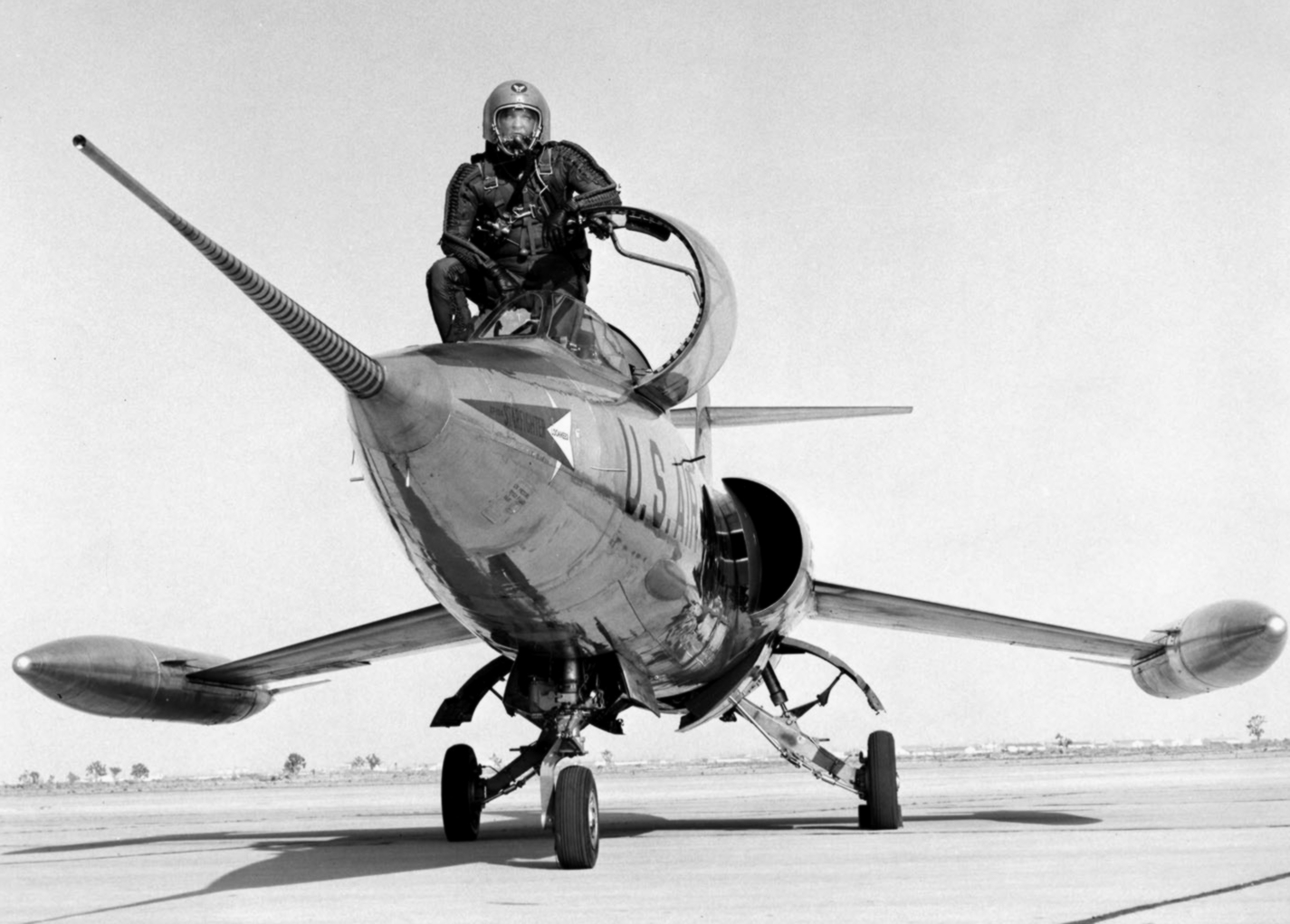
Tony LeVier poses on an XF-104. Note the wingtip tanks

==== First flights ====
The first XF-104 (Lockheed 083-1001, s/n 53-7786) was transported to Edwards AFB amidst high secrecy during the night of 24–25 February, where Lockheed test pilot Tony LeVier was to do the initial testing. On 28 February 1954, the XF-104 made a planned hop of about five feet off the ground during a high-speed taxi, but its first official flight took place on 4 March. During that flight, the landing gear did not retract, and LeVier landed after a low-speed flight of about 20 minutes. Adjustments and further flights discovered that the problem was low pressure in the hydraulic system. Bad weather kept the XF-104 on the ground until 26 March, when further flights were carried out with the landing gear retracting normally.

The second prototype (Lockheed 083-1002, s/n 53-7787), fitted with the afterburning J65 from the start, first flew on 5 October. Since it was to be the armament test bed, it was fitted with the 20 mm (.79 in) M61 Vulcan cannon and was equipped with an AN/ASG-14T-1 fire control system. XF-104 #2 achieved a top speed of Mach 1.79 at 60,000 feet (18,000 m) on 25 March 1955, piloted by Lockheed test pilot J. Ray Goudey. This was the highest speed achieved by the XF-104.

==== Performance ====
XF-104 #1 was subsonic in level flight when powered by the non-afterburning J65, but Mach 1 could be easily exceeded during a slight descent. In July 1954, the J65-B-3 was replaced by the afterburning J65-W-7 turbojet. With this engine installed, the performance of the XF-104 was greatly improved. Maximum level speed was Mach 1.49 at 41,000 ft (12,000 m), and an altitude of 55,000 ft (17,000 m) could be attained in a zoom climb, while Mach 1.6 could be attained in a dive. The first XF-104 was accepted by the USAF in November 1955.

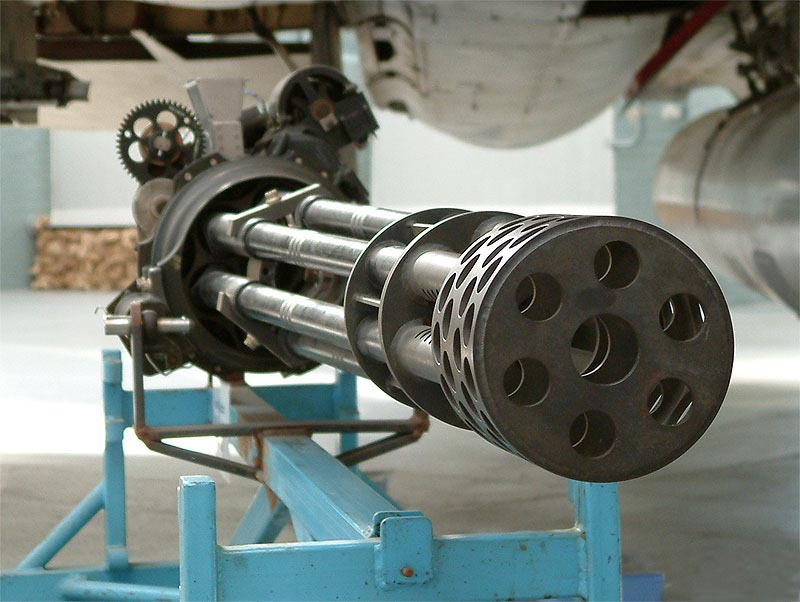
M61 Vulcan

==== Firing tests ====
Initial aerial firing tests with the Vulcan cannon on the second aircraft were successful, but on 17 December, there was an explosion during a firing burst and the J65 engine suffered severe compressor stalls. Tony LeVier immediately shut down the engine and glided back to make a successful deadstick landing at Rogers Dry Lake. An investigation later showed that one of the 20 mm cannon rounds had exploded in the breech, blowing the bolt out the rear of the gun and through the structure into the forward fuselage fuel cell. Jet fuel had run into the gun bay, and leaked out of the compartment door seals and into the left engine air intake. The engine immediately flooded with fuel, causing the compressor stalls.

=== Crashes ===
XF-104 53-7786 was lost in a crash on 11 July 1957 when it developed an uncontrollable fin flutter while flying chase for F-104A flight tests. The entire tail group was ripped from the airframe, and Lockheed test pilot Bill Park was forced to eject. Fin flutter was a known problem and the aircraft had been limited to speeds of no more than Mach 0.95 at the time of the accident. Tony LeVier had attempted to have the aircraft removed from flight status and placed in a museum, arguing that its performance was not suitable for chase duties.

XF-104 53-7787 was lost on 14 April 1955 after accumulating over 1,000 flying hours when test pilot Herman Salmon was forced to eject during gun firing trials at 50,000 ft (15,000 m). The gun malfunctioned during a test firing, and severe vibrations began to build up which knocked loose the ejection hatch below the cockpit. Cabin pressure was lost with Salmon's pressure suit inflating and covering his face so that he could not see. Recalling LeVier's harrowing experience with the exploding cannon shell the previous December, Salmon believed that the same thing had happened to him and that he had no option but to eject. He later found out that he could have saved 53-7787 by bringing it down to a lower altitude and waiting for his pressure suit to deflate. With the loss of the armament testbed, Lockheed engineers were forced to find an alternative, and armament trials were continued on a modified Lockheed F-94C Starfire. The two XF-104s amassed an approximate total of 2,500 flight hours.

=== Testing conclusions ===
Flight testing proved that performance estimates were accurate and that even when fitted with the low powered J65 engine, the XF-104 flew faster than the other Century Series fighters being developed at the time. The XF-104's ceiling at 60,000 ft (18,000 m) was 7,000 ft (2,100 m) higher than predicted, and it exceeded estimated speed and drag figures by two to three percent. It was noted however that the low thrust of the J65 engine did not enable the full performance potential of the type to be realized.

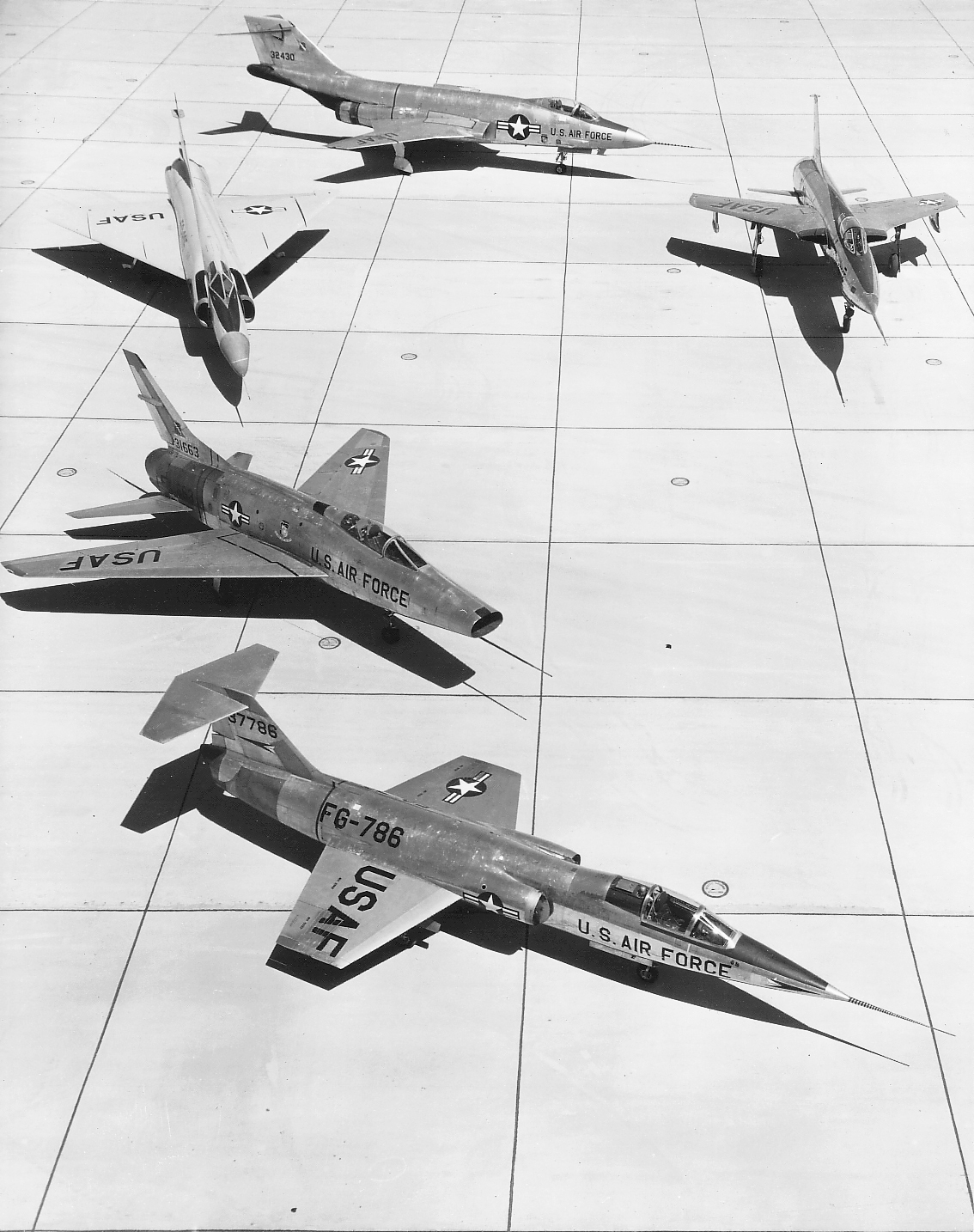
XF-104 s/n 53-7786 with early models of the F-100, F-101, F-102 and F-105

A number of minor problems surfaced, but were readily fixed. The yaw damper of the XF-104 was found to be ineffective and the rudder did not positively center; these problems were corrected by revising the rudder control system. The unpowered rudder did not provide adequate directional control at high air speeds, with the problem being fixed by using hydraulic power on all subsequent versions of the F-104; and some concern was expressed over poor subsonic maneuverability at higher altitudes.

During a later interview, Kelly Johnson was asked about his opinion on the aircraft. "Did it come up to my designs? In terms of performance, yes. In terms of engine, we went through a great many engine problems, not with the J65s but with the J79s." For his part in designing the F-104 airframe, Johnson was jointly awarded the Collier Trophy in 1958, sharing the honor with General Electric (engine) and the U.S. Air Force (Flight Records).

== Specifications (XF-104) ==
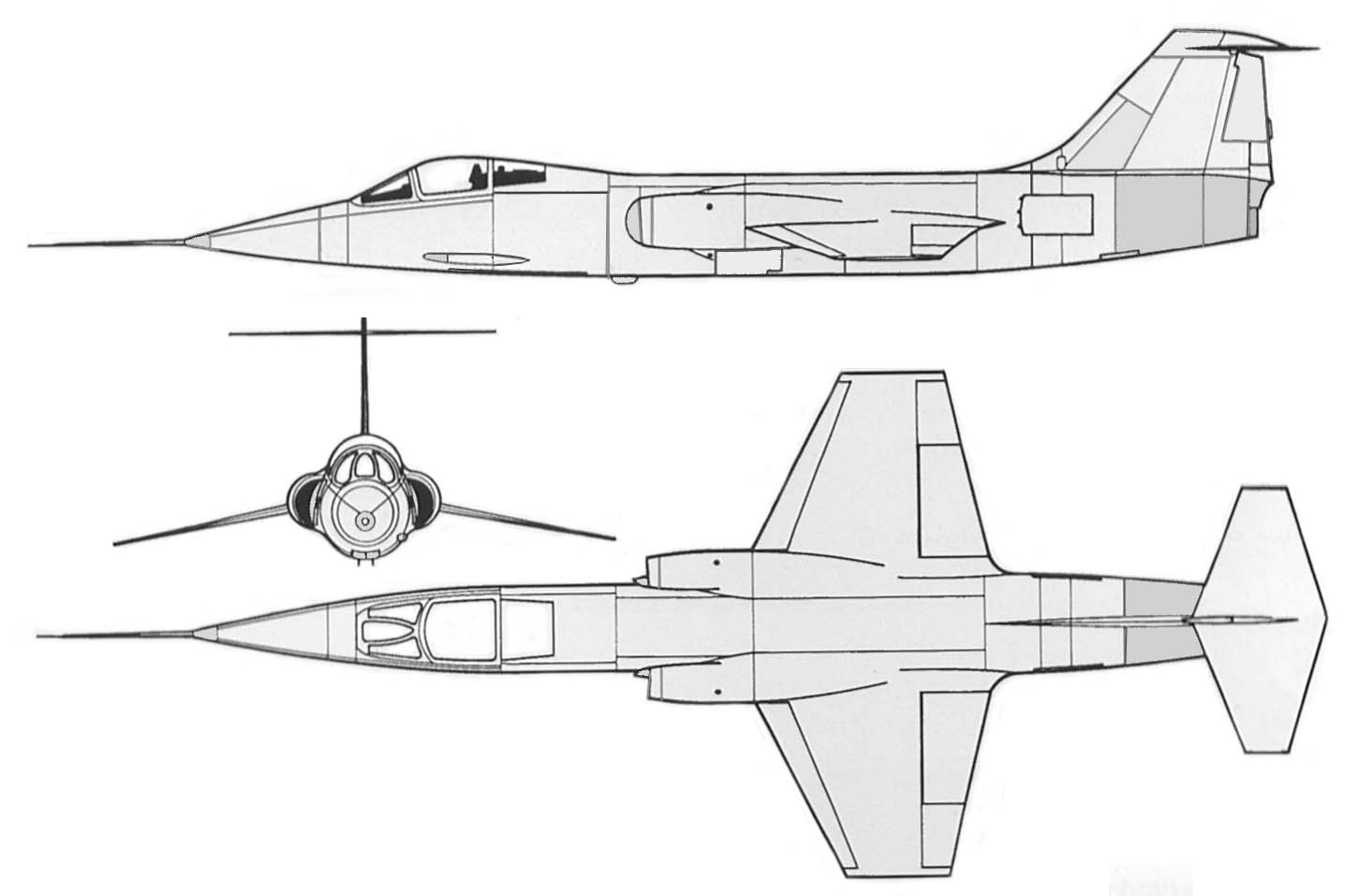
XF-104 3-view

Data from Bowman and Drendel.

General characteristics

- Crew: 1
- Length: 49 ft 2 in (14.99 m)
- Wingspan: 21 ft 11 in (6.68 m)
- Height: 13 ft 6 in (4.11 m)
- Wing area: 196 sq ft (18.2 m^{2})
- Airfoil: Biconvex 3.36%
- Empty weight: 11,500 lb (5,216 kg)
- Gross weight: 15,700 lb (7,121 kg)
- Powerplant: 1 × Wright J65-W-6 turbojet engine, 7,800 lbf (35 kN) thrust dry, 10,200 lbf (45 kN) with afterburner

Performance

- Maximum speed: 1,324 mph (2,131 km/h, 1,151 kn)
- Stall speed: 160 mph (260 km/h, 140 kn)
- Range: 800 mi (1,300 km, 700 nmi)
- Service ceiling: 50,500 ft (15,400 m)

Armament

- Guns: 1 × T171 Vulcan 20 mm (.79 in) cannon (XF-104 083-1002 only)

== See also ==
- Century Series

Related development

- Lockheed NF-104A
- Canadair CF-104
- Aeritalia F-104S
- Lockheed CL-1200 Lancer and X-27

Aircraft of comparable role, configuration, and era

- Dassault Mirage III
- Grumman F-11 Tiger
- Northrop F-5
- Saunders-Roe SR.53

Related lists

- List of fighter aircraft
- List of military aircraft of the United States
- List of F-104 Starfighter operators
