= Northrop N-102 Fang =

Type of aircraft

N-102 Fang
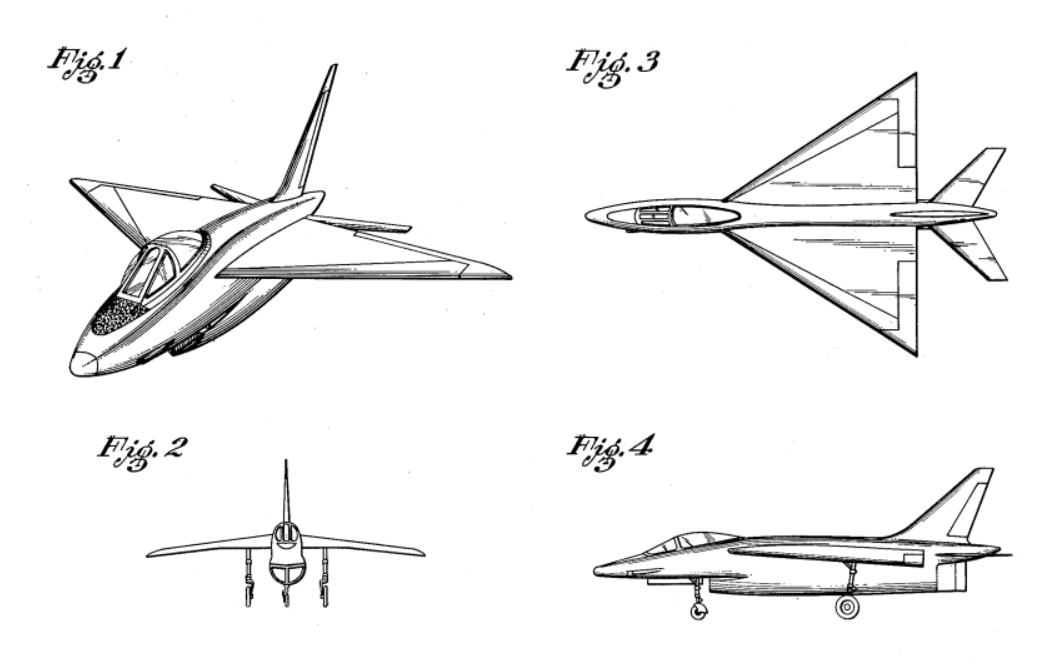
- Patent images of the N-102 design

General information
- Type: Light fighter
- National origin: United States
- Manufacturer: Northrop Corporation
- Status: Project only

History
- Developed into: Northrop F-5 Freedom Fighter

The Northrop N-102 Fang was a fighter aircraft design created by Northrop Corporation and proposed to the United States Air Force in 1953. The Fang was explicitly designed as a ”light” or “lightweight fighter” in direct response to what Northrop saw as the ever-increasing weight, size, complexity, and cost of Western fighter designs. While the Fang was ultimately overlooked in favor of the Lockheed F-104 Starfighter, Northrop’s interest in the lightweight fighter concept would ultimately come to fruition with the F-5 Freedom Fighter, itself spawning a moderately successful fighter family.

== Design and development ==
In the early 1950s, concerns grew in the United States about the growing weight, complexity and cost of modern fighter aircraft, and in late 1952, Northrop started a design study for a simple, lightweight, supersonic fighter aircraft, the N-102 Fang, with the design team headed by Welko E. Gasich, Northrop's Chief of Advanced Design. On 12 December that year, the United States Air Force (USAF) issued a requirement for a lightweight air superiority aircraft to replace the F-100 supersonic fighter. The new aircraft was expected to enter service in 1957 and was required to have a speed of at least Mach 1.3 at 35,000 ft (11,000 m) and a combat radius of 400 mi (650 km). Northrop proposed the N-102 to meet the requirement, while other competitors were from Lockheed (the CL-246), North American Aviation (the NA-212) and Republic Aviation (the AP-55).

The N-102 had a shoulder-mounted delta wing and a small all-moving tailplane mounted behind the wing. It would be powered by a single turbojet mounted in the lower aft fuselage which was supplied by air from a variable-geometry ventral air inlet. This promised smoother, more efficient airflow to the engine at the risk of being more vulnerable to ingestion of foreign objects and damage to the engine. A number of different engines were proposed, including the Pratt & Whitney J57, the Wright J65 (a license-produced derivative of the British Armstrong Siddeley Sapphire), the Wright J67 (a license-built Bristol Olympus) or the General Electric J79, with all of the engines giving an estimated speed of at least Mach 2.

In early 1953, the USAF selected Lockheed's CL-246, which became the Lockheed F-104 Starfighter, but Northrop at first continued work on the N-102 with the hope of gaining export orders, building a mock-up of the aircraft in USAF colors. However, the use of a single, large engine meant that the aircraft could not be as light or cheap as Northrop wanted, and Northrop stopped work on the N-102 during 1954. Northrop continued work on lightweight fighters, basing its further studies on the use of two small General Electric J85 engines, which allowed a much lighter and cheaper aircraft, with Northrop's design team believing that twin engines would increase the reliability and safety margin. The J85-powered design studies eventually formed the basis of the F-5 fighter family.

The design was the subject of a 1957 design patent.

== Specifications (J79 engine – performance estimated) ==
Data from Northrop N-102 "Fang"

General characteristics

- Crew: 1
- Length: 42 ft 7 in (12.97 m)
- Wingspan: 30 ft 8 in (9.34 m)
- Wing area: 270.0 sq ft (25.08 m^{2})
- Gross weight: 18,735 lb (8,498 kg)
- Powerplant: 1 × General Electric J79-GE-1 , 9,300 lbf (41 kN) thrust dry, 14,400 lbf (64 kN) with afterburner

Performance

- Maximum speed: Mach 2
- Combat range: 390 mi (630 km, 340 nmi)
- Ferry range: 2,029 mi (3,266 km, 1,763 nmi)
- Service ceiling: 59,000 ft (18,000 m)
- Rate of climb: 44,500 ft/min (226 m/s)

Armament

- Guns: 1× 20 mm M61 Vulcan 6-barreled rotary cannon or 2× 20mm M39 Revolver cannon
- Missiles: 4× AIM-4 Falcon air-to-air missiles

== See also ==
Related development

- Northrop F-5

Aircraft of comparable role, configuration, and era

- Lockheed F-104 Starfighter
- Mikoyan-Gurevich MiG-21
