= Grumman YF9F =

Grumman YF9F may refer to:

- F-11 Tiger - YF9F-9, US Navy jet aircraft
- F-9 Cougar - YF9F-8, US Navy jet aircraft
