= Grumman F11F-1F Super Tiger =

Prototype of an upgraded Grumman F11F/F-11

F11F-1F Super Tiger
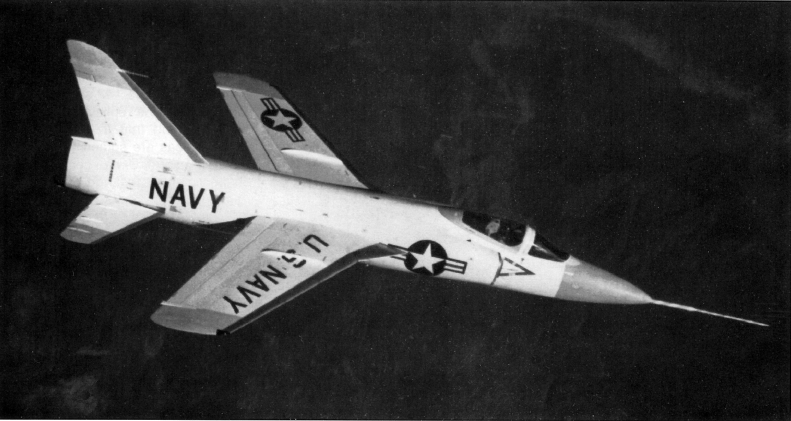
- An F11F-1F Super Tiger prototype, with a General Electric J79 engine, in 1956

General information
- Type: Fighter aircraft
- National origin: United States
- Manufacturer: Grumman
- Status: Canceled
- Primary user: United States Navy
- Number built: 2

History
- First flight: 25 May 1956
- Developed from: Grumman F-11 Tiger

The Grumman F11F-1F Super Tiger (company designation G-98J) is a single-seat fighter aircraft originally developed for the United States Navy (USN). Based on the USN's F-11 Tiger, the F11F-1F did not proceed beyond the two F11F-1F prototypes.

== Design and development ==
As an improvement to the F11F-1 (F-11A) fighter, Grumman proposed a more advanced version of the airframe known as the F11F-1F Super Tiger. This was the result of a 1955 study to fit the new General Electric J79 engine into the F11F airframe. The Navy was sufficiently interested to authorize modification of two production F11F-1s with enlarged air intakes and YJ79-GE-3 turbojets, with the result being designated the F11F-1F, indicating a production F11F-1 with a special engine fit.

The aircraft first flew on 25 May 1956, reaching Mach 1.44 in one of the flights. After the addition of 60° wing root fillets, a 13.5 in (35 cm) fuselage extension, and an uprated J79 engine, the F11F-1F reached an impressive Mach 2.04 in 1957, thus becoming the first naval aircraft in the world to exceed Mach 2 (two years before the F4H, F8U-3, and A3J). This was a surprise even to Grumman, which had expected a top speed of only Mach 1.4 at altitude. By comparison, the F11F-1 with the Wright J65 had had difficulty exceeding Mach 1.1. However, the U.S. Navy did not order the Super Tiger into production. Although the service ceiling of the aircraft was nominally 59,000 feet (18,000 m), a test flight on 18 April 1958 at Edwards AFB set a world altitude record of 76,939 feet (23,451 m).

== Operational history ==
=== Marketing efforts ===
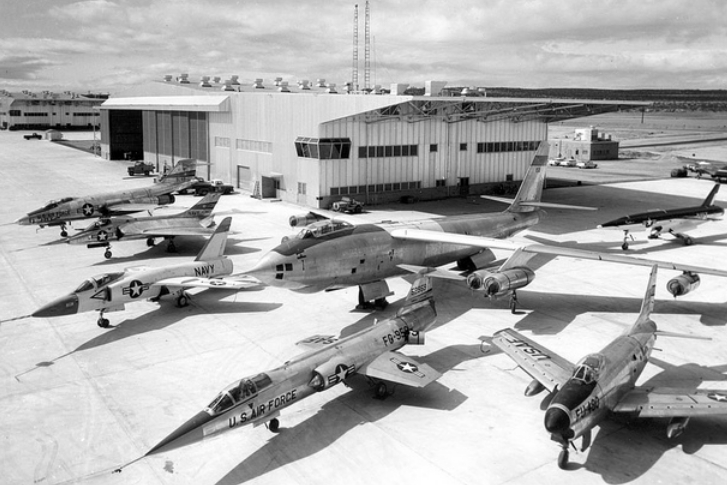
An F11F-1F (3rd from top) with other test aircraft at Edwards AFB, 1958.

Grumman marketed the F11F to many potential foreign customers during the late 1950s and early 1960s. For varying reasons, this campaign was unsuccessful, including the fact that the Super Tiger had not been accepted by the US government for any of the US services.

In a tender to equip the Swiss Air Force, the Super Tiger competed with the Saab Draken, Lockheed F-104 Starfighter, Dassault Mirage III, and Fiat G.91. The Mirage was chosen, partly on the grounds that it was cheaper and more secure in terms of replacements and spare parts; however, Swiss assessors reportedly considered that, in terms of overall technical performance, the F11F surpassed the other aircraft considered.

The German Air Force, Japan Air Self Defense Force, and Royal Canadian Air Force also showed interest. With an eye to the possibility of an order from West Germany in particular, Grumman offered to build a variant with the 10,500 lbf (47 kN) Rolls-Royce Avon instead of the J79. However, following selection processes allegedly marred by the Lockheed bribery scandals, all of these potential customers chose the Lockheed F-104 Starfighter.

== Variants ==
F11F-1F Super Tiger
(G-98J) Two Grumman F11F-1 aircraft fitted with J79-GE-3A engines, (BuNos 138646 and 138647).
F11F-2
Intended pre-1962 designation of production Super Tigers.
F-11B
The post-1962 designation reserved for production Super Tigers.
XF12F
Semi-official designation for a developed version of the F11F-1F/-2.

== Operators ==
United States

- United States Navy
- General Electric

== Aircraft on display ==
The first F11F-1F (BuNo 138646) was used for fire-fighting practice and destroyed in the 1980s. The second prototype (BuNo 138647) was retired on 10 January 1961 and used as a ground training aircraft. As of October 2020, it is displayed outdoor at the China Lake Museum in Ridgecrest, CA. The aircraft is on loan from the Naval Air Weapons Station China Lake, California.

== Specifications (F11F-1F) ==
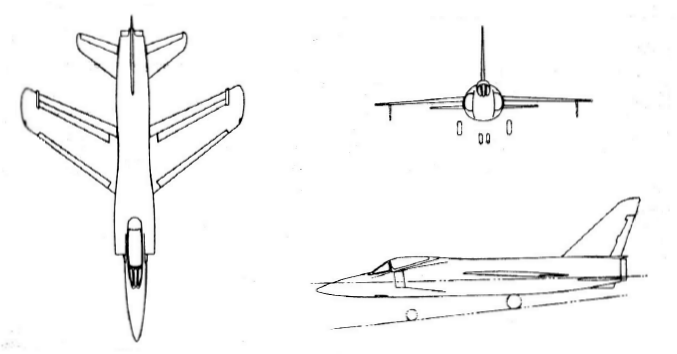

Data from Secret Projects: Fighters & Interceptors 1945–1978.

General characteristics

- Crew: one
- Length: 48 ft 9 in (14.85 m)
- Wingspan: 31 ft 8 in (9.65 m)
- Height: 14 ft 4 in (4.36 m)
- Wing area: 250 sq ft (23.25 m^{2})
- Empty weight: 13,810 lb (6,277 kg)
- Gross weight: 21,035 lb (9,561 kg)
- Max takeoff weight: 26,086 lb (11,833 kg)
- Powerplant: 1 × General Electric J79-GE-3A turbojet, 12,533 lbf (55.75 kN) thrust dry, 17,000 lbf (76 kN) with afterburner

Performance

- Maximum speed: 1,400 mph (2,253 km/h, 1,200 kn) at 40,000 ft (12,200 m)
- Maximum speed: Mach 2.04
- Range: 1,536 mi (1,826 km, 1,336 nmi)
- Service ceiling: 59,000 ft (17,980 m)

Armament

- Guns: 4 × 20 mm (.79 in) Colt Mk 12 cannon, 125 rounds per gun
- Hardpoints: 4 with a capacity of -, with provisions to carry combinations of:
  - Missiles: AIM-9 Sidewinder

== See also ==
Related development

- Grumman F-11 Tiger

Aircraft of comparable role, configuration, and era

- Douglas F5D Skylancer
- Supermarine Scimitar
- Vought F-8 Crusader

Related lists

- List of fighter aircraft
- List of military aircraft of the United States
