= VF-43 =

Fighter Squadron 43
- Active: 1 May 1945 – 1 July 1994
- Country: United States
- Branch: United States Navy
- Part of: Inactive
- Nicknames: Mach Busters; Challengers
- Aircraft: F4U-5 Corsair; F8F Bearcat; F-9F8 Cougar; FJ-3 Fury; F-11 Tiger; T-2 Buckeye; A-4F Skyhawk; T-38 Talon; F-5 Tiger II; F-21A Kfir; F-16N Viper

VF-43 was a fighter squadron of the U.S. Navy. The squadron was originally established as Fighter Squadron 74A (VF-74A) on 1 May 1945, it was redesignated Fighter Squadron 74 (VF-74) on 1 August 1945, redesignated VF-1B on 15 November 1946, redesignated VF-21 on 1 September 1948, redesignated as Attack Squadron 43 (VA-43) Challengers on 1 July 1959 and Fighter Squadron 43 (VF-43) on 1 June 1973. It was disestablished on 1 July 1994.

== Operational history ==
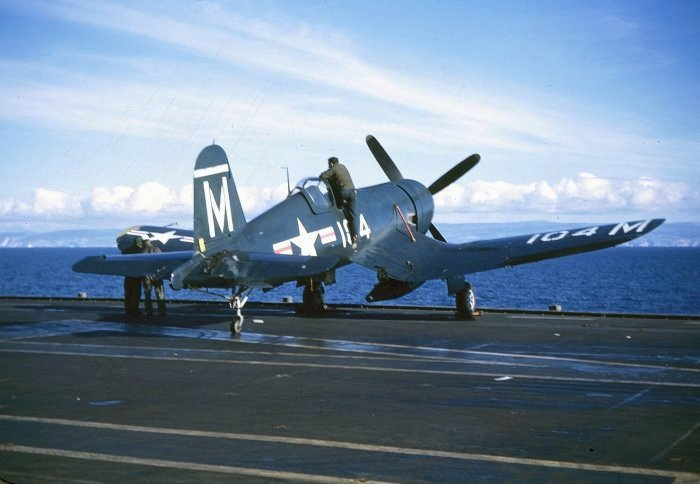
VF-1B F4U-4 on USS Midway c.1947

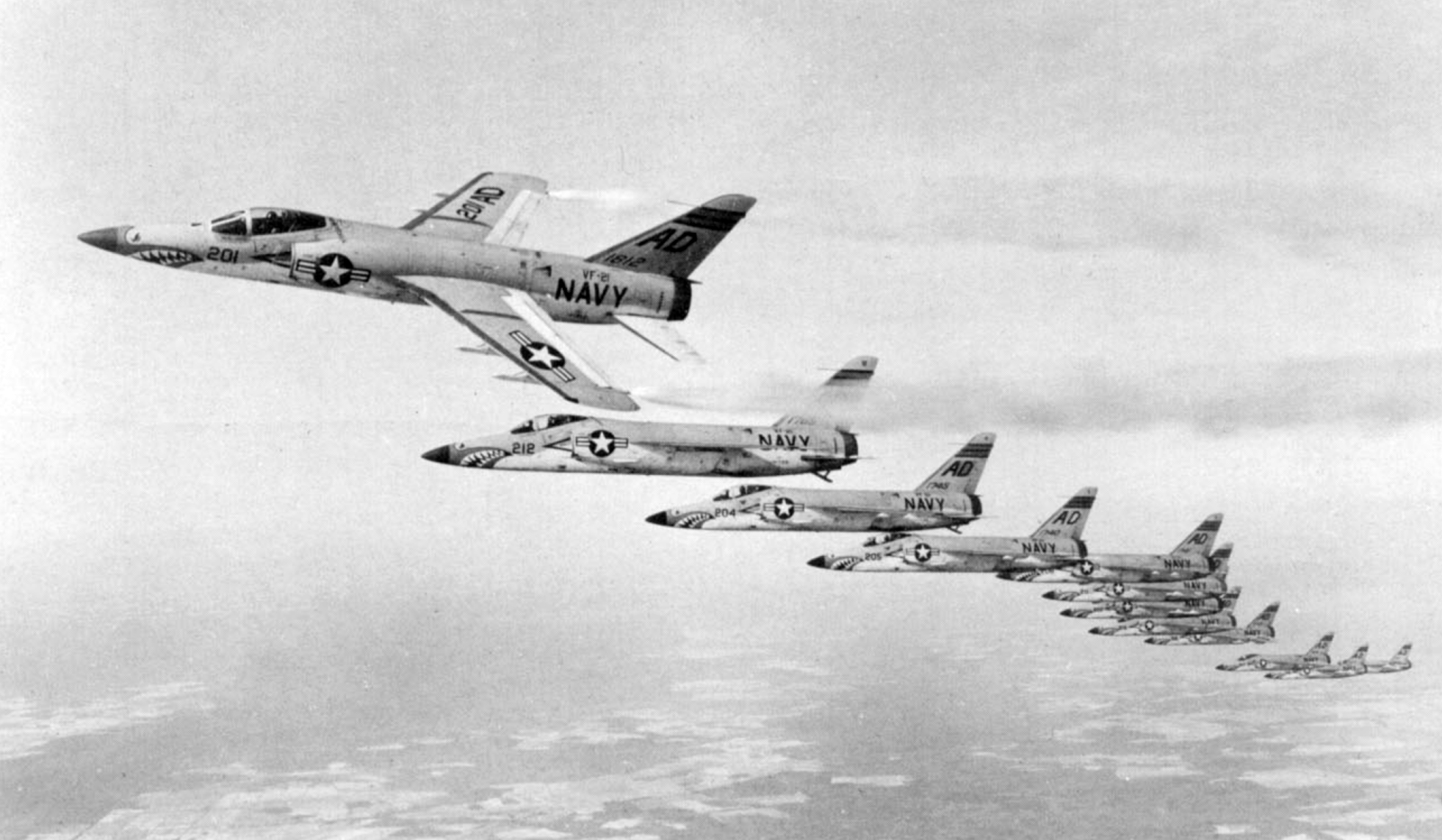
VF-21 F-11Fs in 1959

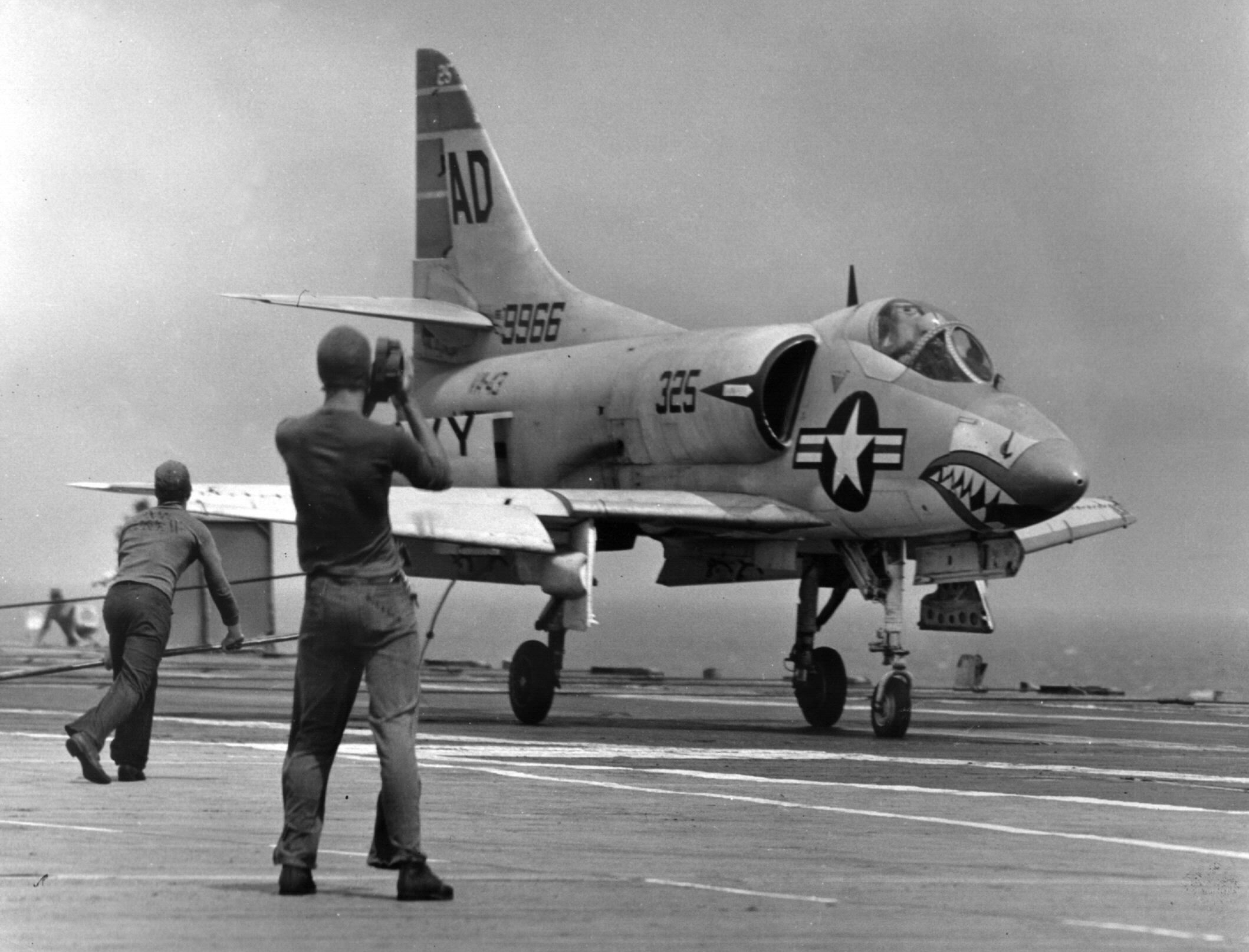
VA-43 A-4D lands on USS Antietam in 1959

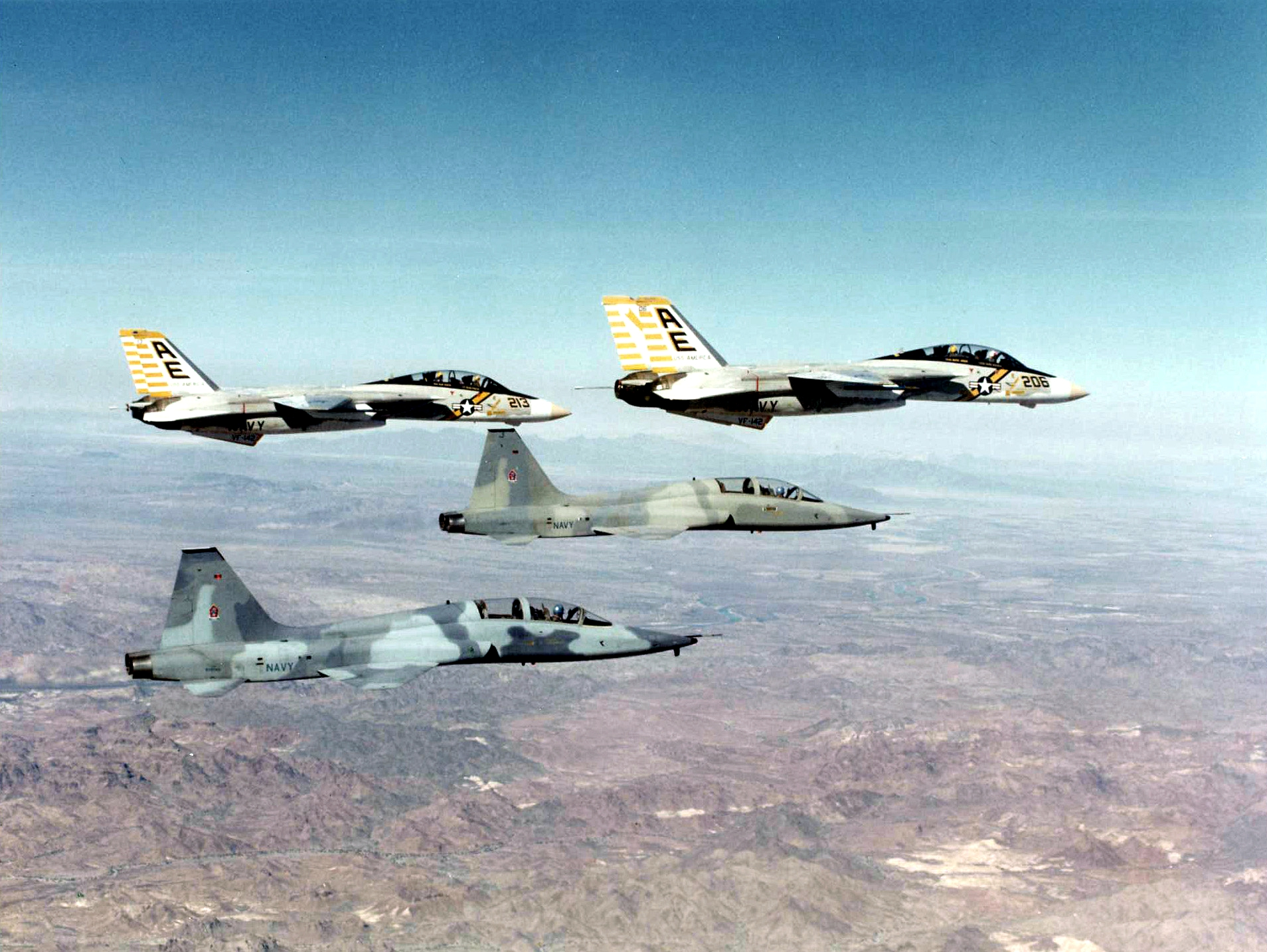
VF-43 T-38 Talons with VF-142 F-14As in 1977

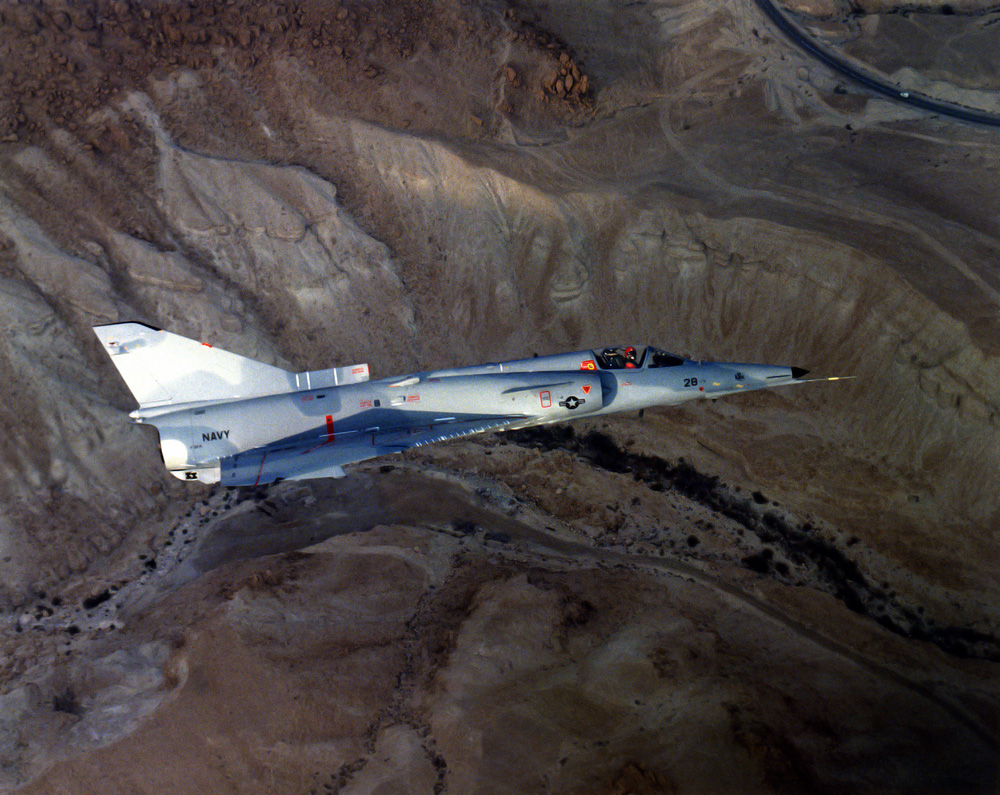
VF-43 F-21A Kfir in 1985

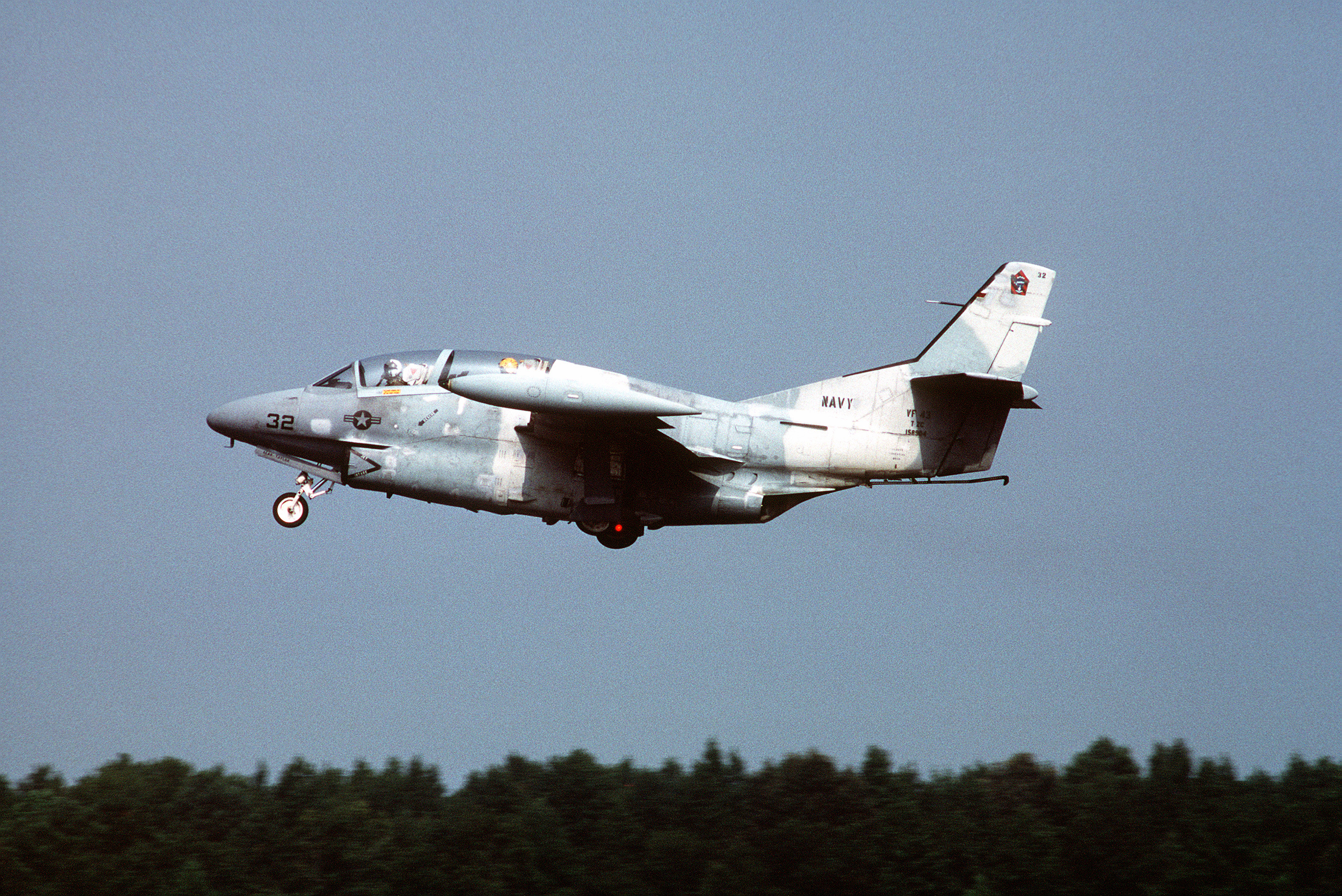
VF-43 T-2 Buckeye taking off from NAS Oceana in 1989

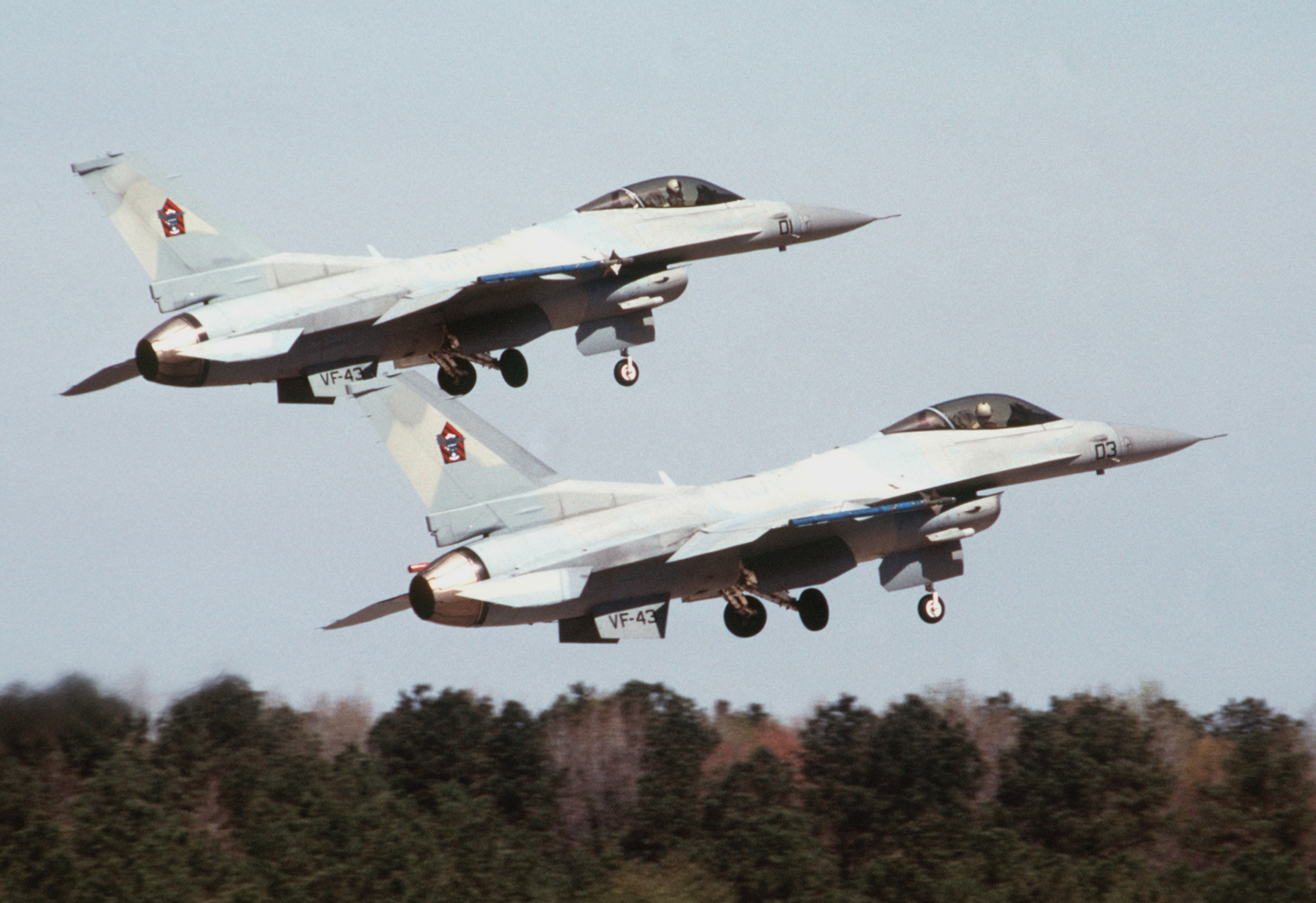
VF-43 F-16N Vipers taking off from NAS Oceana in 1989

VF-1B was assigned to Carrier Air Group One (CVBG-1), aboard USS Midway and was embarked on Midway's first deployment from 29 October 1947 to 11 March 1948 to the Mediterranean.

VF-21 was assigned to Carrier Air Group Six (CVG-6) and deployed to the Mediterranean aboard USS Midway from 9 January to 5 May 1952.

VF-21 was assigned to Air Task Group 181 (ATG-181) aboard USS Forrestal from 24 January to 31 March 1956 during her shakedown cruise in the Atlantic, and aboard USS Bennington for a Western Pacific deployment from 15 October 1956 to 22 May 1957.

VF-21 was assigned to Carrier Air Group 8 (CVG-8) aboard the USS Ranger in 1957 and served on Ranger's shakedown cruise from 4 October to 6 December 1957. This would be VF-21's last deployment.

On 1 July 1959 VF-21 was redesignated as Attack Squadron 43 (VA-43) and became a fleet replacement squadron for the F-11 Tiger and later the A-4 Skyhawk. The squadron subsequently adopted the moniker of the "Challengers" in 1961.

In June 1973, the squadron was redesignated as Fighter Squadron FORTY-THREE (VF-43) and was assigned as an Atlantic Fleet adversary squadron at NAS Oceana, Virginia in support of training Atlantic Fleet fighter squadrons collocated at NAS Oceana. In this role, the squadron would fly the A-4F/J and TA-4F/J Skyhawk II, the T-38A Talon, the F-16N Fighting Falcon, and the F-21A Kfir, the latter being an Israeli-built modification of the Dassault Mirage 5. The squadron also conducted instrument proficiency training and spin training in the T-2C Buckeye. Following the end of the Cold War and subsequent reductions in the U.S. defense budget, VF-43 was identified for disestablishment. Following VF-43's inactivation in July 1994, its mission was assumed by strike fighter and fighter composite squadrons in the Naval Air Reserve. At NAS Oceana, this mission is primarily accomplished by Fighter Composite Squadron 12 (VFC-12).

The squadron was homeported from NAS Oceana throughout its existence.

== Aircraft used ==
- Vought F4U Corsair (F4U-5 model)
- Grumman F8F Bearcat
- F-9F8 Cougar
- FJ-3 Fury
- Grumman F-11 Tiger
- North American T-2 Buckeye
- Douglas A-4 Skyhawk (A-4F model)
- T-38 Talon
- F-21A Kfir - 1985-88
- F-16N Viper - 1987-1994
