= Grumman F-11 Tiger =

US Navy carrier-based fighter aircraft in service 1956–1969

F11F/F-11 Tiger
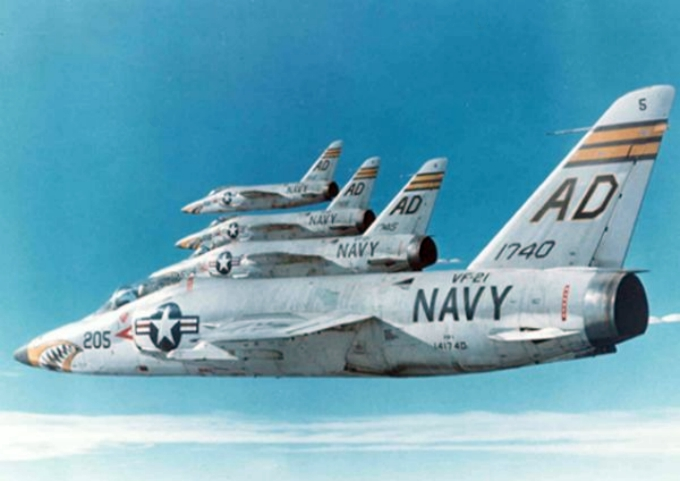
- VF-21 F11F-1 Tigers in left echelon formation

General information
- Type: Fighter aircraft
- Manufacturer: Grumman
- Status: Retired
- Primary user: United States Navy
- Number built: 199

History
- Manufactured: 1954–1959
- Introduction date: 1956
- First flight: 30 July 1954
- Retired: 1961 (Carrier); 1967 (Training); 1969 (Blue Angels)
- Variant: Grumman F11F-1F Super Tiger

The Grumman F11F/F-11 Tiger is a supersonic, single-seat carrier-based fighter aircraft designed and produced by the American aircraft manufacturer Grumman. For a time, it held the world altitude record of 76,939 feet (23,451 m), as well as being the first supersonic fighter to be produced by Grumman.

Work on what would become the Tiger commenced in 1952 as a design study, internally designated G-98, to improve the F9F-6/7 Cougar. However, the design produced had little association with the Cougar by the end of the project. The U.S. Navy Bureau of Aeronautics placed an order for two prototypes, initially designated XF9F-8. On 30 July 1954, the first prototype performed its maiden flight, during which it almost achieved Mach 1; the second prototype became the second U.S. Navy aircraft to exceed the speed of sound. On 21 September 1956, the Tiger became the first jet aircraft to shoot itself down. Originally designated the F11F Tiger in April 1955 under the pre-1962 Navy designation system, the aircraft was redesignated as F-11 Tiger under the 1962 United States Tri-Service aircraft designation system. A total of 199 Tigers were produced for the United States Navy, with the last aircraft being delivered to the service on 23 January 1959.

The Tiger entered service with the U.S. Navy during 1956, and was flown from the carriers Intrepid, Lexington, Hancock, Bon Homme Richard, Shangri-La, Forrestal, Saratoga and Ranger. Frontline use of the Tiger was relatively brief, largely due to its performance being inferior to the competing Vought F-8 Crusader, such as its limited endurance, while its Wright J65 turbojet engine had also proved to be somewhat unreliable. Through to the late 1960s, the aircraft was flown by the Naval Air Training Command in South Texas at NAS Chase Field and NAS Kingsville, to give students experience of supersonic flight. Between 1957 and 1969, the Tiger was used by the Blue Angels flight team, being eventually replaced by the McDonnell Douglas F-4 Phantom II. The last examples were withdrawn from U.S. Navy service during 1969, although a handful of aircraft remained operational and were conducting test flights as late as 1975.

== Design and development ==
=== Background ===
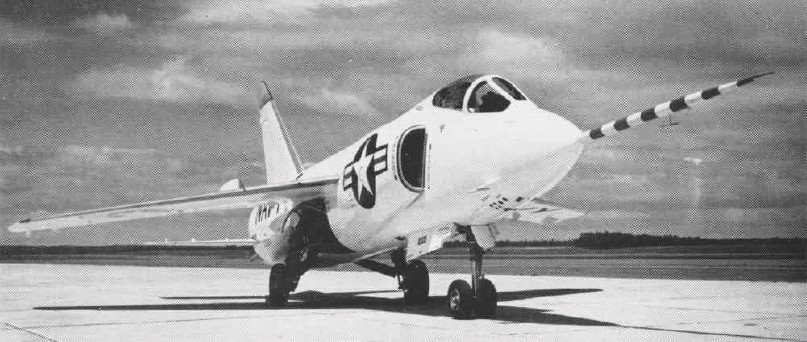
XF9F-9 prototype

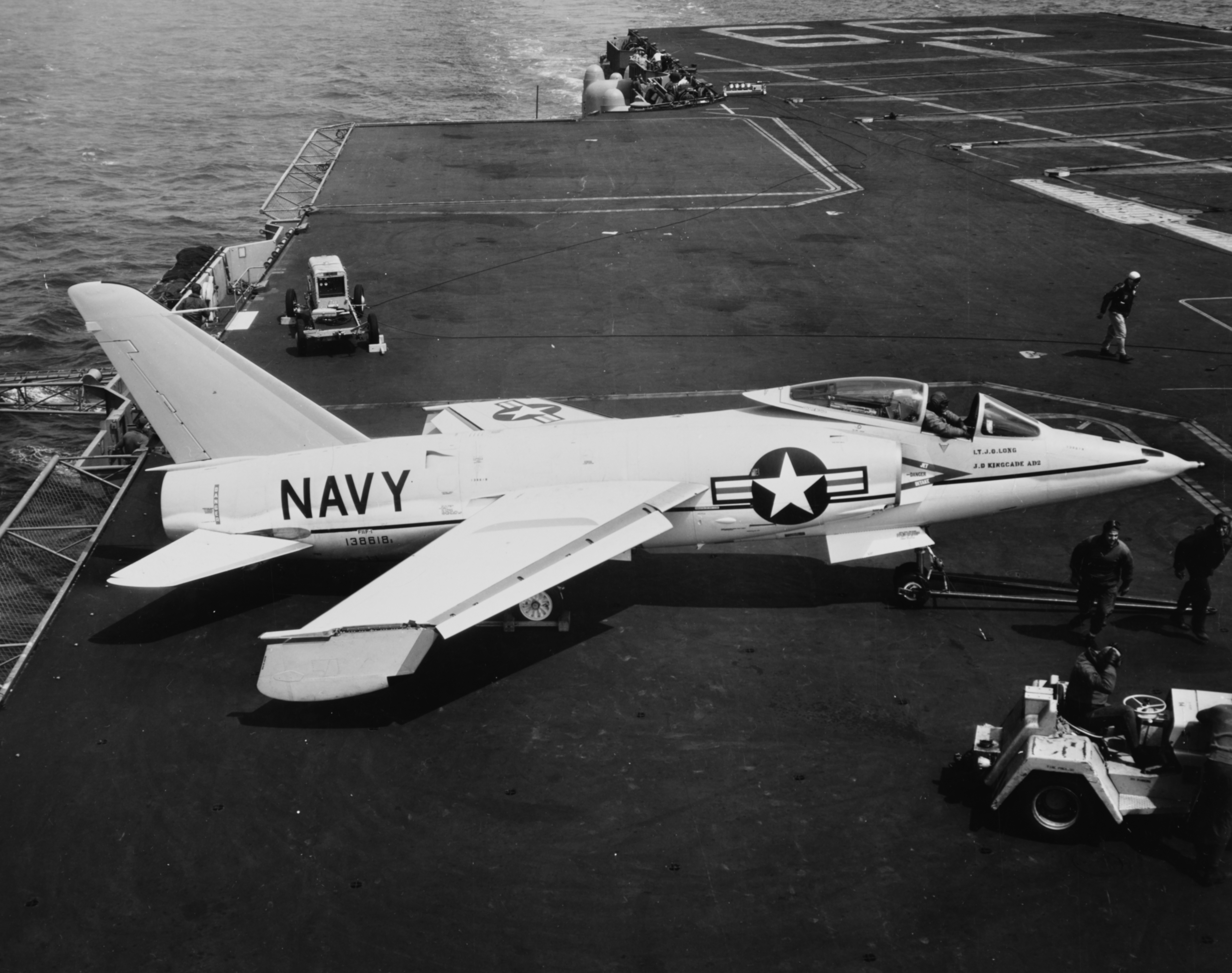
An F11F-1 Tiger on USS Forrestal (CVA-59), with downward-folded wingtips

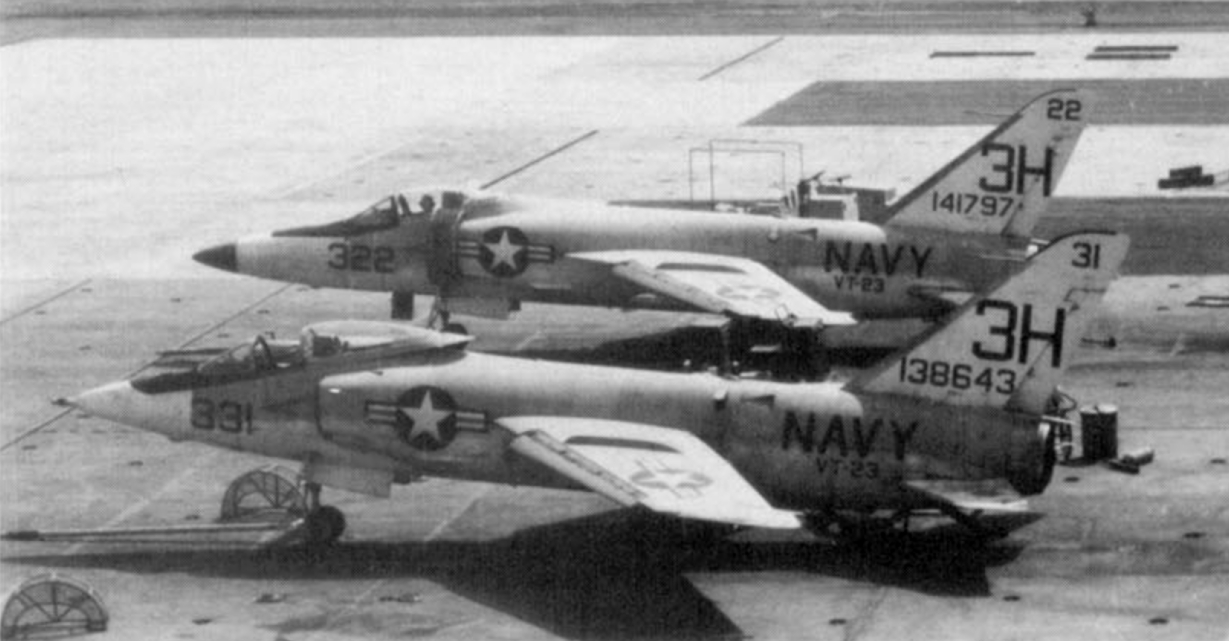
An early production "short nose" F11F and a later "long nose" from VT-23

The origins of the F11F (F-11) Tiger can be traced back to a privately funded 1952 Grumman concept to modernize and improve the F9F-6/7 Cougar, a popular early jet-powered carrier aircraft. The design team opted to implement the area rule along with several other advances into the project, which was internally designated G-98. Design objectives included the minimisation of the aircraft's size. By the time that the design process was concluded during 1953, it had become a complete departure from the Cougar, bearing little more than a vague resemblance to the preceding aircraft.

It features a new wing equipped with both full-span leading edge slats and trailing edge flaps with roll control being achieved using spoilers rather than traditional ailerons. For storage on aircraft carriers, these wings could be manually folded downwards. Anticipating supersonic performance, the tailplane was all-moving. The aircraft was designed to be powered by the Wright J65 turbojet, a license-built version of the Armstrong Siddeley Sapphire.

The design's potential for supersonic performance and reduced transonic drag drew the attention of several officials, including those within the United States Navy. During early 1953, the U.S. Navy Bureau of Aeronautics decided to commit itself to the project's full development, placing an initial order for two prototypes, which were designated XF9F-8 (even though the new fighter was clearly a new design). To add to the confusion, the prototypes were then redesignated XF9F-9 while the XF9F-8 designation was assigned to a different, more straightforward, derivative of the Cougar.

=== Flight testing ===
Since the afterburning version of the J65 was not ready, the first prototype made its maiden flight on 30 July 1954 powered by a non-afterburning engine. In spite of this, the aircraft nearly reached Mach 1 during this first flight. The second prototype, equipped with the afterburning engine, became the second supersonic U.S. Navy aircraft, the first being the Douglas F4D Skyray. During April 1955, the aircraft received the new designation F11F-1 (F-11A after adoption of the unified Tri-Service naming system in 1962). On 4 April 1956, carrier trials started when an F11F-1 Tiger landed on and launched from USS Forrestal.

The Tiger gained the dubious distinction of being the first jet aircraft to shoot itself down. On 21 September 1956, during a test-firing of its 20 mm (0.79 in) cannons, pilot Tom Attridge fired two bursts midway through a shallow dive. As the trajectory of the cannon rounds decayed, they ultimately crossed paths with the Tiger as it continued its descent, disabling the aircraft and forcing Attridge to crash-land the aircraft; he survived with a broken leg and multiple broken vertebrae.

Grumman proposed several models of the Tiger, beyond the F-11A (F11F-1) fighter, including aerial reconnaissance and dedicated trainer versions. The more advanced version of the airframe to be proposed by the company was the F11F-1F Super Tiger. It was the result of a 1955 study to install the new General Electric J79 engine into the F11F-1 airframe. When evaluated by Switzerland for a potential procurement, it was assessed as having exceeded all competing aircraft in terms of overall technical performance. Grumman also proposed to produce a variant powered by the proven, and even more powerful, Rolls-Royce Avon engine in place of the J79.

== Operational history ==
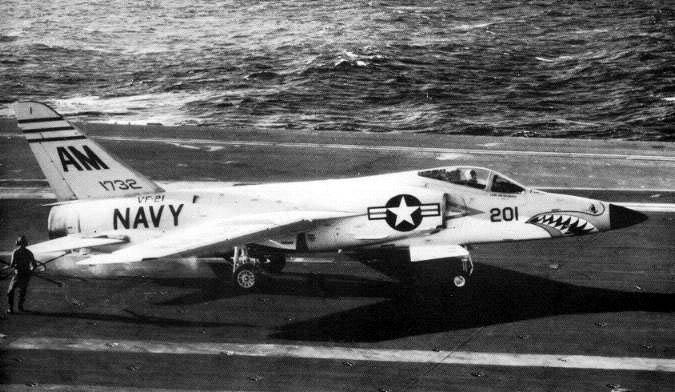
F11F-1 of VF-21 landing on Ranger in 1957

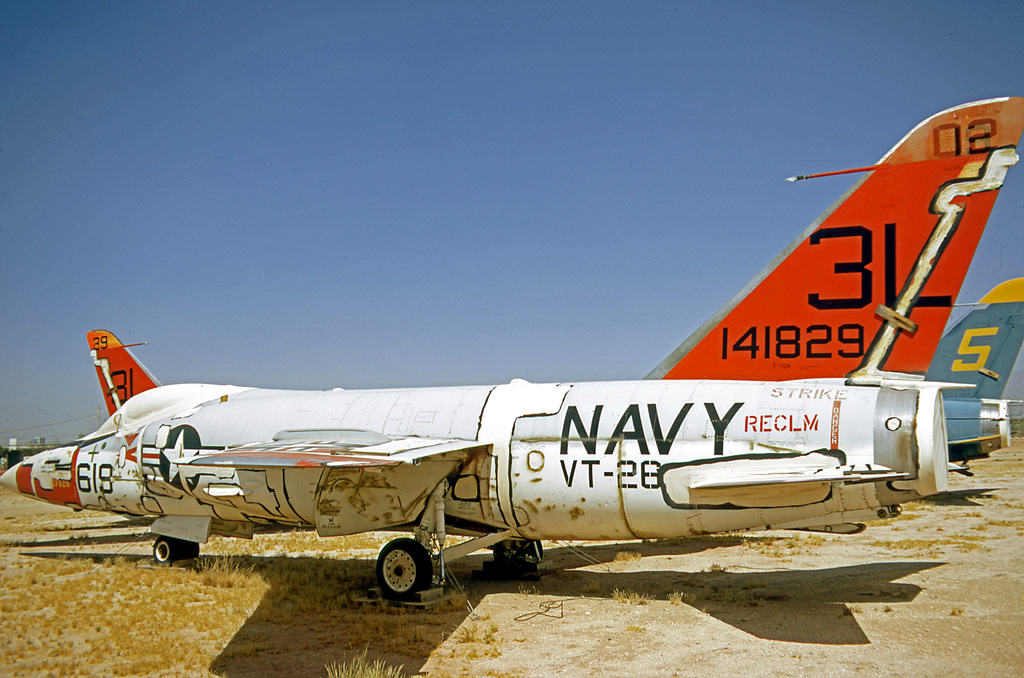
F-11A Tiger advanced trainer of VT-26 Squadron wearing the distinctive color scheme used by that variant

Seven U.S. Navy squadrons flew the Tiger, these included VF-21 and VF-33 in the Atlantic Fleet and VA-156 (redesignated VF-111 in January 1959), VF-24 (redesignated VF-211 in March 1959), VF-51, VF-121, and VF-191 in the Pacific Fleet. The aircraft was operated from the carriers Intrepid, Lexington, Hancock, Bon Homme Richard, Shangri-La, Forrestal, Saratoga, Ranger and Independence. The F11F's career as a frontline fighter lasted only four years, largely as a result of its performance being inferior to the competing and considerably faster Vought F-8 Crusader; further factors included the unreliability of its J65 powerplant, and the inadequacy of both its range and endurance. At no point was the Tiger ever capable of sustained supersonic flight in an operational configuration. The Navy opted to cancel its orders for the F11F-1P reconnaissance version, thus only 199 F11F-1 (F-11A) fighters were ever built.

By 1961, the Tiger had been permanently withdrawn from carrier operations. Nevertheless, it continued to be operated by the Naval Air Training Command in South Texas at NAS Chase Field and NAS Kingsville, through to the late 1960s. Typically, students performed advanced jet training in the TF-9J Cougar and upon completing that syllabus, were given a brief taste of supersonic capability with the F-11 before transitioning to active fleet fighters. The Tiger's flight characteristics lent itself well to the training role.

While the Tiger's career as a fighter was relatively short, the Blue Angels performed in the aircraft between 1957 and 1969, at which point the Tiger was replaced by the McDonnell Douglas F-4 Phantom II.

Prior to the 1962 code unification, the Tiger was designated as the F11F; after unification, it was renamed F-11.

During 1973, two former Blue Angels F-11As were taken from storage at Davis-Monthan AFB and modified by Grumman as testbeds to evaluate in-flight thrust control systems. BuNo 141853 was fitted with a Rohr Industries thrust reverser and BuNo 141824 was kept in standard configuration as a chase plane. Tests of the inflight thrust reversal were carried out by Grumman at Calverton beginning in March 1974 and continued at NATC Patuxent River, Maryland until 1975. Following the completion of these tests, both planes were returned to storage at Davis Monthan AFB. These were the last Tigers to fly.

== Variants ==
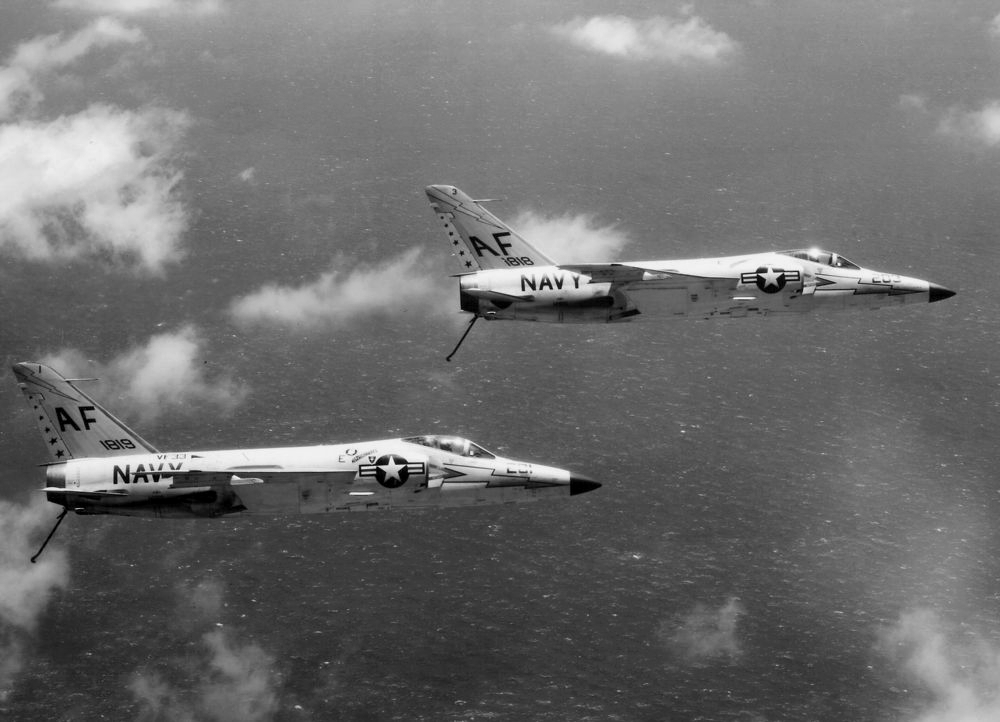
VF-33 Tigers from USS Intrepid in 1959

F9F-9
Original designation.
F11F-1
Single-seat fighter version for the U.S. Navy, redesignated F-11A in 1962. 199 built and later production aircraft had a longer nose. One was used for static tests with a further production of 231 aircraft cancelled.
F11F-1P
Designation of a Navy photo reconnaissance version, 85 were cancelled.
F11F-1F Super Tiger (G-98J)
F11F-1 fitted with the J79-GE-3A engine, two built.
F11F-1T
Proposed tandem-seat trainer variant; unbuilt.

== Operators ==
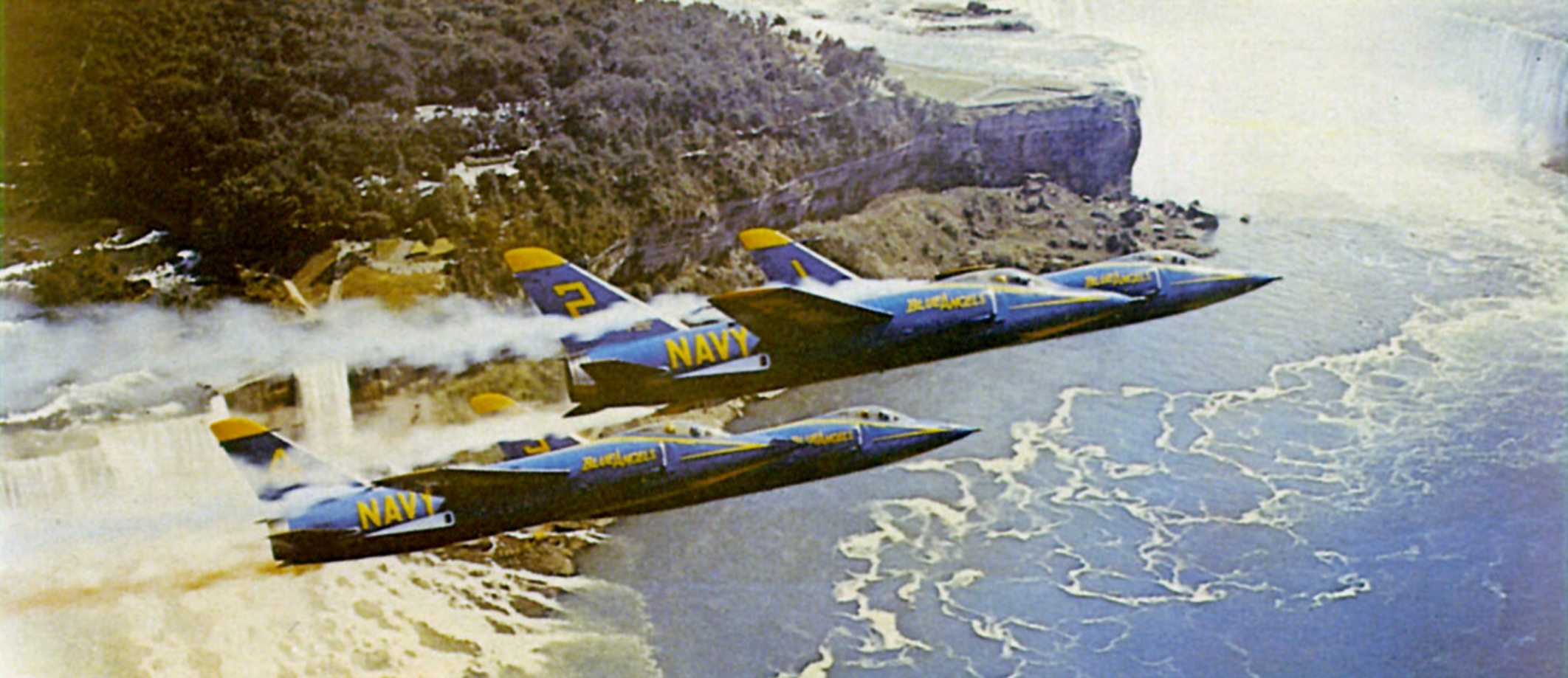
The Blue Angels flew the F11F from 1957 to 1969.

United States

- United States Navy
  - VF-21, Atlantic Fleet
  - VF-24, Pacific Fleet
  - VF-33, Atlantic Fleet
  - VF-51, Pacific Fleet
  - VF-121, Pacific Fleet
  - VA-156, Pacific Fleet
  - VF-191, Pacific Fleet
  - ATU-203 (redesignated VT-23)
  - ATU-223 (redesignated VT-26)
  - Blue Angels (1957–1969)

== Aircraft on display ==
F11F-1

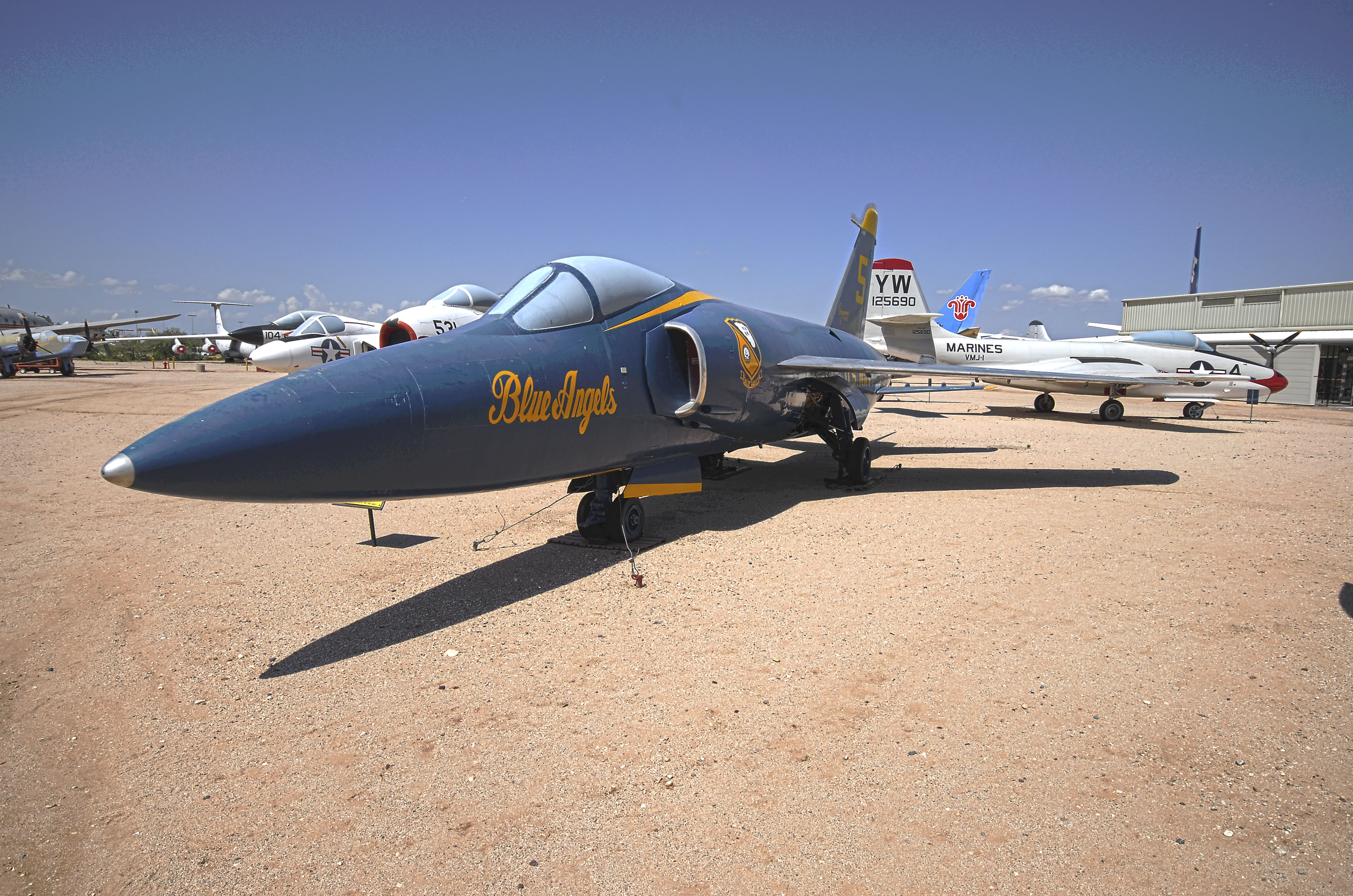
Former Blue Angels F-11 Tiger at the Pima Air & Space Museum in Tucson, Arizona

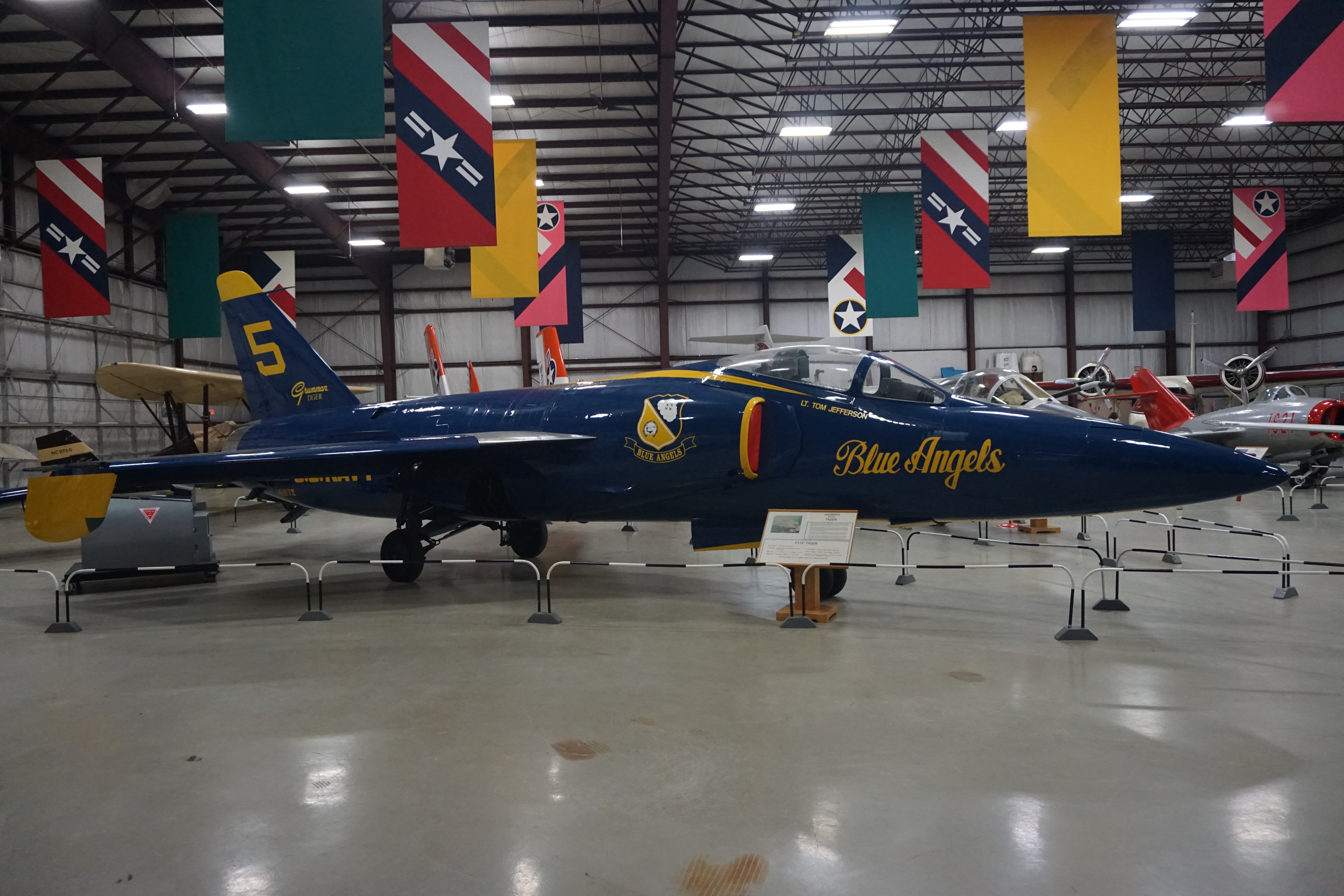
F11F on display at the Air Zoo

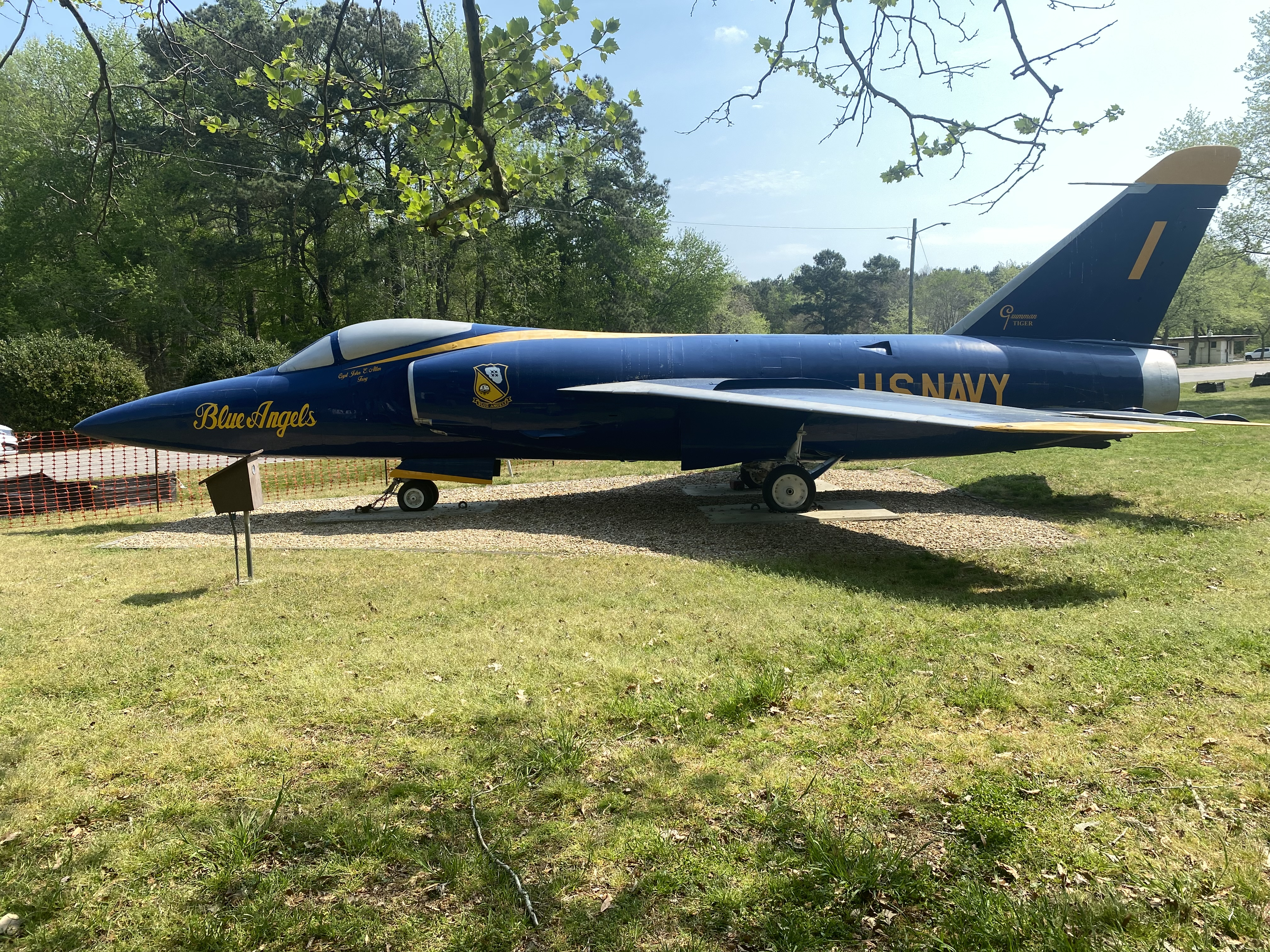
Grumman Tiger on display at the Aviation Historical Park in NAS Oceana, Virginia Beach

- 138608 - California Science Center in Los Angeles, California. Previously displayed at Admiral Farragut Academy, St. Petersburg, Florida.
- 138619 – Stricklands Surplus in Wilmington, North Carolina.
- 138645 – NAF El Centro in Imperial County, California.
- 141735 – Yanks Air Museum in Chino, California.
- 141783 – MAPS Air Museum in Canton, Ohio.
- 141790 – Grissom Air Museum at Grissom Air Reserve Base near Peru, Indiana.
- 141802 – Lawson Creek Park in New Bern, North Carolina.
- 141803 – Port of South Louisiana Executive Regional Airport in Reserve, Louisiana.
- 141811 – Combat Air Museum in Topeka, Kansas.
- 141824 – Pima Air & Space Museum in Tucson, Arizona.
- 141828 – National Museum of Naval Aviation at Naval Air Station Pensacola, Florida.
- 141832 – Cradle of Aviation Museum in Garden City, New York.
- 141851 – NAES Lakehurst, New Jersey.
- 141853 – Pueblo Weisbrod Aircraft Museum in Pueblo, Colorado.
- 141859 – Veteran's Memorial Park in Tishomingo, Oklahoma.
- 141864 – NAS Oceana Aviation Historical Park, Virginia.
- 141868 – Planes of Fame Air Museum in Valle, Arizona.
- 141872 – Air Zoo in Kalamazoo, Michigan.
- 141882 – Valiant Air Command Warbird Museum in Titusville, Florida.
- 141869 – Discovery Park of America in Union City, Tennessee.

== Specifications (F11F-1/F-11A) ==
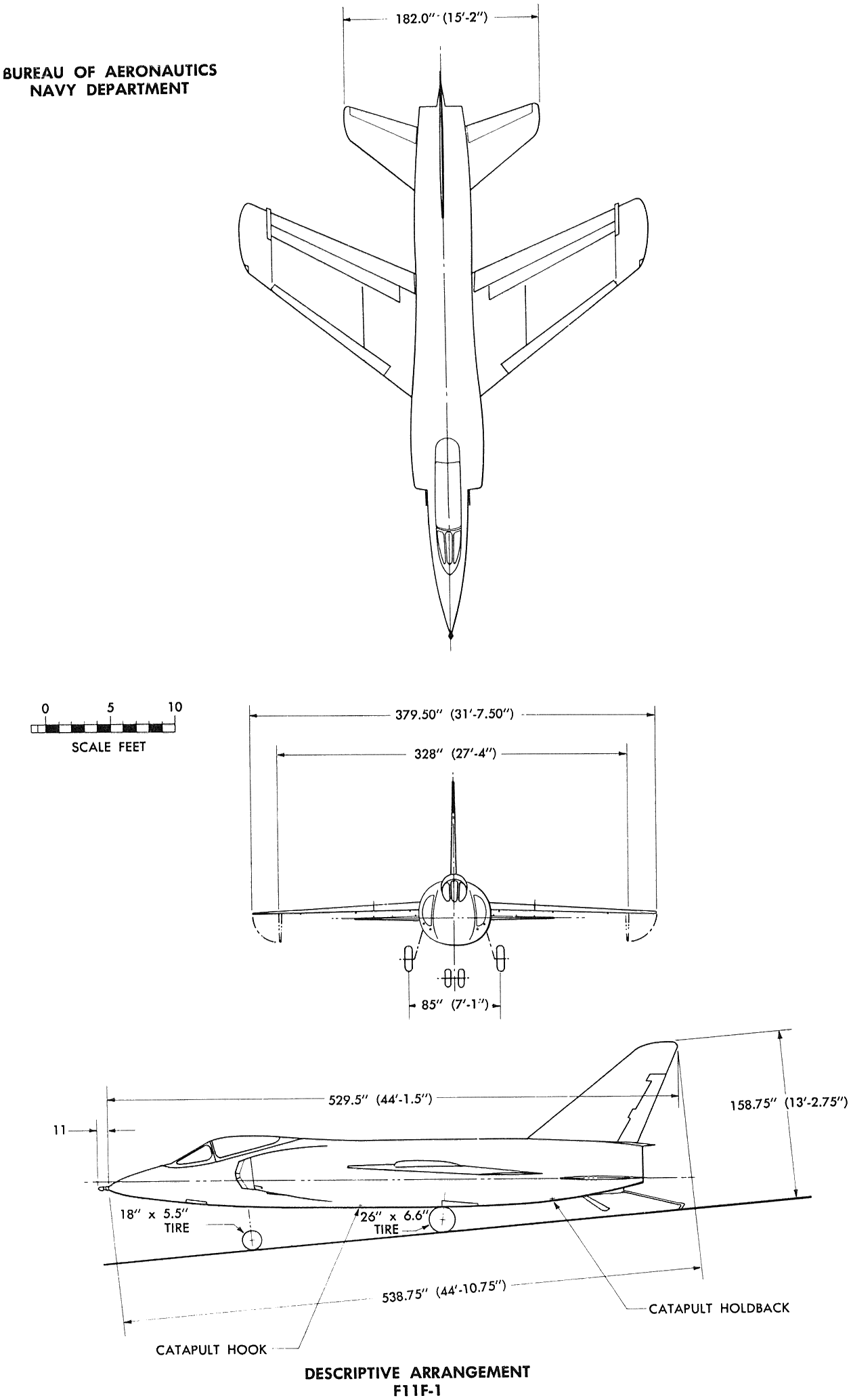
3-view line drawing of the Grumman F-11F-1 Tiger

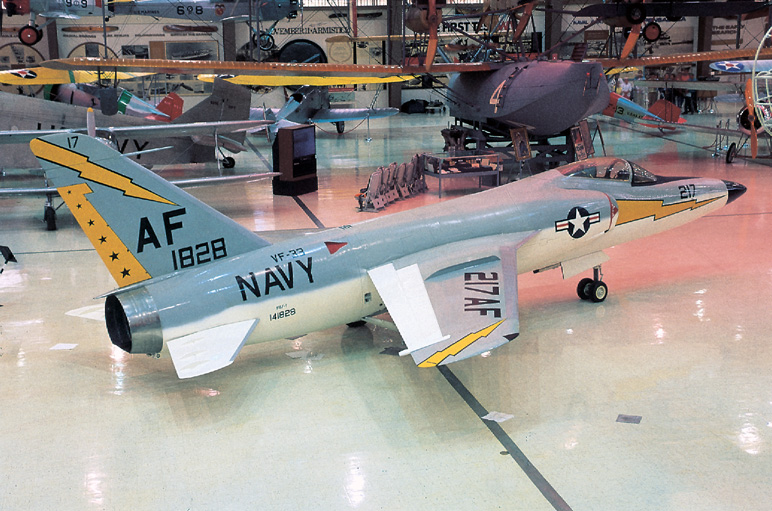
F11F-1 of the National Museum of Naval Aviation at NAS Pensacola, Florida

Data from United States Navy Aircraft since 1911 Standard Aircraft Characteristics: F-11A

General characteristics

- Crew: 1
- Length: 45 ft 10.5 in (13.98 m)
- Wingspan: 31 ft 7.5 in (9.64 m)
- Width: 27 ft 4 in (8.33 m) wing-tips folded
- Height: 13 ft 2.75 in (4.03 m)
- Wing area: 250 sq ft (23 m^{2})
- Empty weight: 13,810 lb (6,264 kg)
- Gross weight: 21,035 lb (9,541 kg)
- Max takeoff weight: 23,459 lb (10,641 kg)
- Powerplant: 1 × Wright J65-W-18 afterburning turbojet engine, 7,450 lbf (33.1 kN) thrust at 8,300 rpm, military power dry, 10,500 lbf (47 kN) with afterburner

Performance

- Maximum speed: 631 kn (726 mph, 1,169 km/h) / M1.1 at 35,000 ft (11,000 m)

654 kn (753 mph; 1,211 km/h) at sea level

- Cruise speed: 501 kn (577 mph, 928 km/h)
- Range: 1,110 nmi (1,280 mi, 2,060 km)
- Service ceiling: 49,000 ft (15,000 m)
- Rate of climb: 16,300 ft/min (83 m/s)
- Wing loading: 84 lb/sq ft (410 kg/m^{2})
- Thrust/weight: 0.5

Armament

- Guns: 4 × 20 mm (.79 in) Colt Mk 12 cannon, 125 rounds per gun
- Hardpoints: 4 with a capacity of –, with provisions to carry combinations of:
  - Rockets: Aero 6A or Aero 7A "Rocket Package"
  - Missiles: AIM-9 Sidewinder
  - Other: 150 US gal (570 L) drop tank

Avionics

- AN/APA-89 – Video coder
- AN/APG-30A – Fire-control radar
- AN/APX-6B – IFF Mark X (SIF) transponder
- AN/ARA-25 – UHF direction finding receiver
- AN/ARC-27A – UHF communications transceiver
- AN/ARN-14E – VOR navigation receiver
- AN/ARR-40 UHF

== See also ==
Related development

- Grumman F-9 Cougar
- Grumman F11F-1F Super Tiger
- Grumman G-118

Aircraft of comparable role, configuration, and era

- Douglas F5D Skylancer
- Supermarine Scimitar
- Vought F-8 Crusader

Related lists

- List of fighter aircraft
- List of military aircraft of the United States
