= Wright J65 =

Turbojet aircraft engine

J65
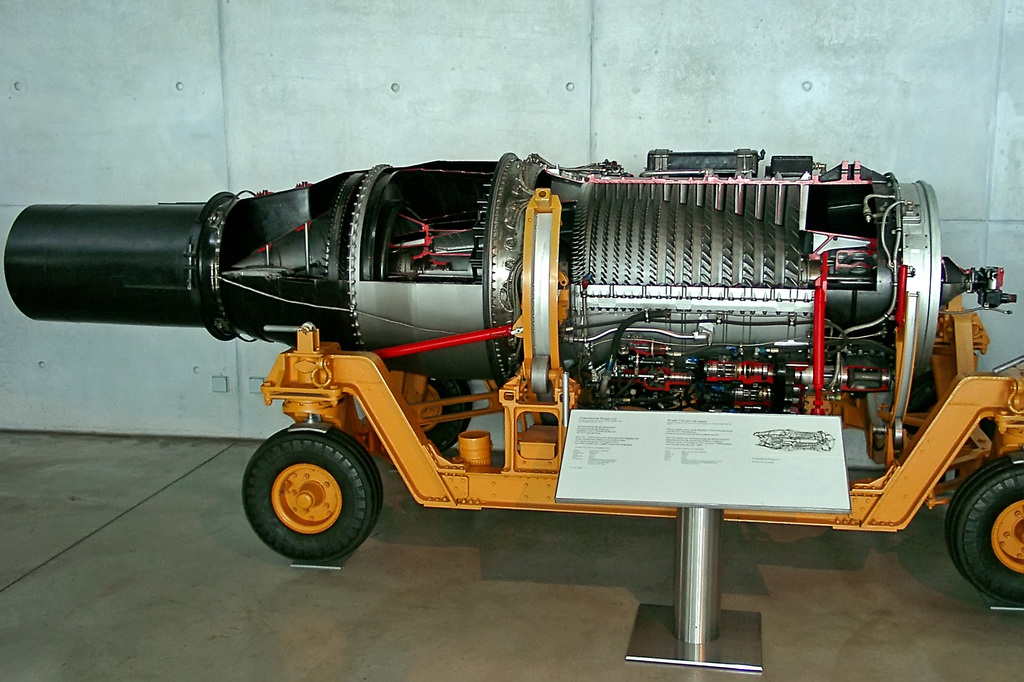
- A sectioned Wright J65
- Type: Turbojet
- National origin: United States
- Manufacturer: Curtiss-Wright
- First run: March 1951 (J65)
- Major applications: Douglas A-4 Skyhawk; Grumman F-11 Tiger; Martin B-57 Canberra; North American FJ-2/-3 Fury; Republic F-84F Thunderstreak
- Number built: 10,023
- Developed from: Armstrong Siddeley Sapphire

The Wright J65 was an axial-flow turbojet engine produced by Curtiss-Wright under license from Armstrong Siddeley. A development of the Sapphire, the J65 powered a number of US designs.

== Design and development ==
Curtiss-Wright purchased a license for the Sapphire in 1950, with plans to have the production lines running in 1951. However a series of delays due to design changes by Curtiss-Wright, such as substituting the Sapphire's machined midsection solid forged diffuser frame with a fabricated one of welded nodular iron, led to its service introduction slipping two years. The fabricated assembly, a more practicable production job with about one fifth the cost, was subsequently adopted for the Sapphire.

Another change addressed the Sapphire's only major problem. The Sapphire was found to work well through the entire RPM range without the compressor stalling, which allowed it to dispense with inlet guide vanes or other solutions found on contemporary designs. However, in service it was found that while pressure was maintained even at low speeds and RPM, the first stages were stalling and this was causing significant vibration and fatigue issues. Wright solved this by adding inlet ramps that closed off the outer portions of the intake at low RPM. Armstrong Siddeley evaluated this for the UK Sapphires, but adopted a different solution instead.

By service introduction, the Pratt & Whitney J57 was on the market and took many of the J65's potential sales. Nevertheless, along with the Martin B-57 Canberra, its original application, the J65 went on to power versions of the North American FJ-3/4 Fury, Douglas A-4 Skyhawk, Republic F-84F Thunderstreak, and the two Lockheed XF-104 Starfighter prototypes. Problems Grumman had with the engine in the F11F Tiger, particularly below-spec afterburning thrust, caused them to specify the General Electric J79 for the Grumman F11F-1F Super Tiger.

As part of an expansion in defense contracts, Buick also built J65s. Its version of the engine, the J65-B-3, was approved for use by the U.S. Air Force in 1953. Components were produced by subcontractors including Oldsmobile, which built the compressor and turbine rotor assemblies; Harrison Radiator, which built the combustion chamber and tailcone; and Brown-Lipe-Chapin, which built the turbine stator blades and compressor stator assemblies. Final assembly was carried out in a 768,000 sq ft (71,300 m^{2}) portion of a purpose built plant in Willow Springs, Illinois. (Note: The remaining portion of the plant was used by Fisher to build automobile bodies.)

=== Wright T49 ===
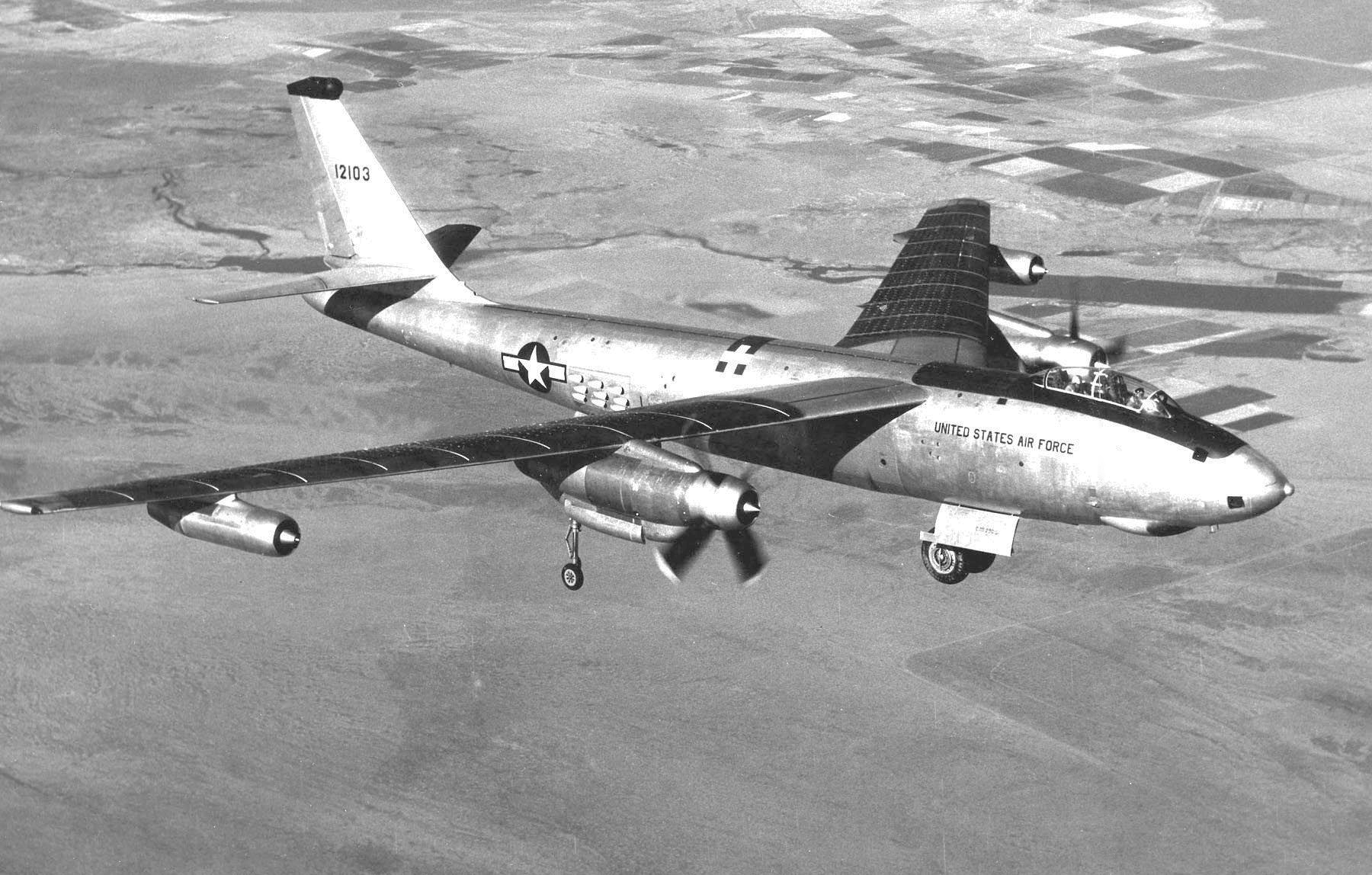
XB-47D fitted with two YT49 turboprops and four-blade paddle propeller

A 6,500–10,380 shp (4,850–7,740 kW) turboprop version of the J65 (Sapphire) was developed by Curtiss-Wright as the Wright T49, and a commercial derivative, the Wright TP51A2 was also designed. The T49 first ran in December 1952 at 8,000 shp (6,000 kW), followed by flight testing in a Boeing XB-47D test bed from 26 August 1955. By this time however, the market for the engine had vanished.

== Variants ==
Thrust given in foot-pounds (lbf) and kilonewtons (kN).

J65-W-1
7,200 lbf (32 kN)
J65-W-2
7,220 lbf (32.1 kN), similar to -1, United States Navy (USN) variant, powered North American FJ-3 Fury
J65-W-3
7,700 lbf (34 kN), powered the Republic F-84F Thunderstreak
J65-B-3
similar to -1, production by Buick Motor Division of General Motors Corporation, 3,343 built
J65-W-4
7,700 lbf (34 kN), powered North American FJ-3 Fury, two North American FJ-4 Fury prototypes
J65-W-4B
7,650 lbf (34.0 kN)
J65-W-5
J65-W-6
7,800 lbf (35 kN) / 10,200 lbf (45 kN) with afterburner, powered the Lockheed XF-104 Starfighter
J65-W-7
7,700 lbf (34 kN)
J65-W-8
7,450 lbf (33.1 kN) at 8,300 rpm dry / 10,500 lbf (47 kN) with afterburner, powered Grumman F11F-1 / F-11A Tiger
J65-W-11
J65-W-12
J65-W-16
J65-W-16A
7,700 lbf (34 kN), powered the North American FJ-4 / F-1 Fury
J65-W-16C
8,500 lbf (38 kN)
J65-W-18
10,500 lbf (47 kN) -16A with reheat
J65-W-20
8,200 lbf (36 kN), powered Douglas A4D-2N / A-4C Skyhawk

== Applications ==
J65

- Douglas A-4 Skyhawk
- Grumman F-11 Tiger
- Martin B-57 Canberra
- Lockheed XF-104
- North American FJ-3 Fury
- North American FJ-4 Fury
- Republic F-84F Thunderstreak

T49

- Boeing XB-47D (T49 testbed)

== Specifications (J65-B) ==
==== General characteristics ====
- Type: turbojet
- Length: ~122 in (3,100 mm)
- Diameter: 37.52 in (953 mm)
- Dry weight: 2,776 lb (1,259 kg)

==== Components ====
- Compressor: Single-spool 13-stage axial
- Combustors: annular
- Turbine: 2-stage axial

==== Performance ====
- Maximum thrust: 7,239 lbf (32.20 kN)
- Overall pressure ratio: 7:1
- Air mass flow: 119.05 lb/s (54.00 kg/s)
- Turbine inlet temperature: ~848 °C (1,560 °F)
- Specific fuel consumption: ~0.916 lb/(lbf⋅h) (25.9 g/(kN⋅s))
- Thrust-to-weight ratio: 2.61

== See also ==
Related development

- Armstrong Siddeley Sapphire

Comparable engines

- de Havilland Gyron Junior
- Rolls-Royce Avon

Related lists

- List of aircraft engines
