= Armstrong Siddeley Sapphire =

1940s British turbojet aircraft engine

Sapphire
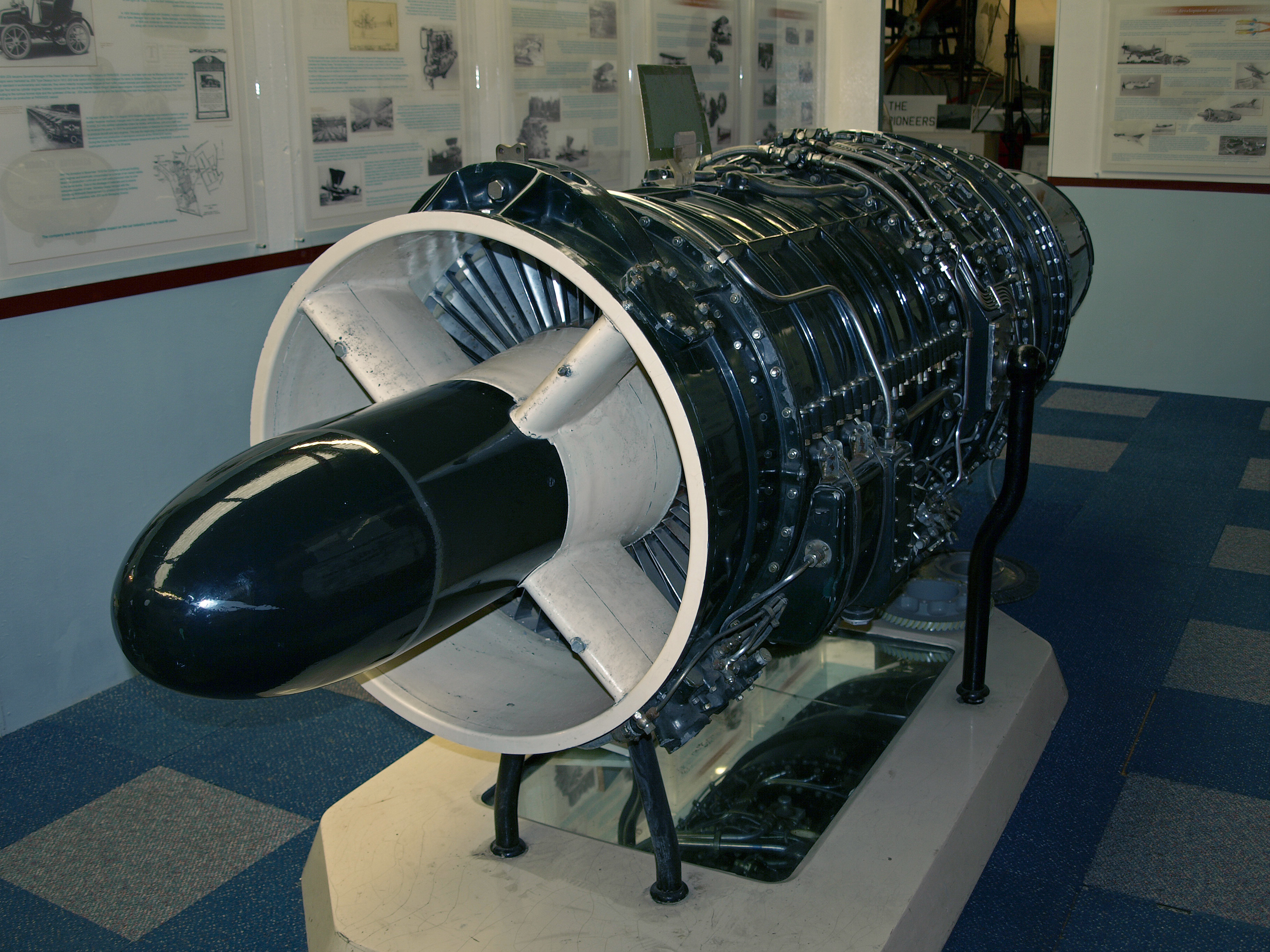
- Preserved Armstrong Siddeley Sapphire at the Midland Air Museum
- Type: Turbojet
- Manufacturer: Armstrong Siddeley
- First run: 1 October 1948
- Major applications: Gloster Javelin; Handley Page Victor; Hawker Hunter
- Variants: Wright J65

The Armstrong Siddeley Sapphire is a British turbojet engine that was produced by Armstrong Siddeley in the 1950s. It was the ultimate development of work that had started as the Metrovick F.2 in 1940, evolving into an advanced axial flow design with an annular combustion chamber that developed over 11,000 lbf (49 kN). It powered early versions of the Hawker Hunter and Handley Page Victor, and every Gloster Javelin. Production was also started under licence in the United States by Wright Aeronautical as the J65, powering a number of US designs. The Sapphire's primary competitor was the Rolls-Royce Avon.

== Design and development ==
Design evolution of the Sapphire started at Metropolitan-Vickers (Metrovick) in 1943 as an offshoot of the F.2 project. With the F.2 reaching flight quality at about 1,600 lbf (7,100 N), Metrovick turned to producing larger designs, both an enlarged F.2 known as the Beryl, as well as the much larger F.9 Sapphire. (The names were chosen after a decision to use gemstones for future engine names). The Beryl eventually developed 4,000 lbf (18 kN) thrust, but the only project to select it, the Saunders-Roe SR.A/1, was cancelled. The Ministry of Supply (MoS) designated the F.9 as the MVSa.1.

In 1948 Metrovick exited the jet engine industry. Armstrong Siddeley, who already had a turbine development of their own, the ASX, took over the MVSa.1, now renamed ASSa.1.

After a redesign it emerged as the ASSa.2. In December 1949 the ASSa.2 completed an acceptance test at 7,380 lbf (32,800 N). Its competitor, the Avon RA.3 had a design thrust of 6,500 lbf (29,000 N) at that time. A number of companies expressed interest in the Sapphire, and it was considered as either the main or backup powerplant for most British designs of the late '40s and early '50s.

The ASSa.5 with 7,500 lbf (33,000 N) thrust was used only on the English Electric P.1A, prototype for the Lightning. A simple fixed-nozzle reheat was fitted to extend the performance boundary for stability and control testing from about Mach 1.1 to beyond Mach 1.5. Future versions of the Lightning were powered by the Avon.

The ASSa.6, 8,300 lbf (37,000 N), was used on the Gloster Javelin FAW Mk.1, Hawker Hunter F.Mk.2 and F.Mk.5, and the prototype Sud Ouest SO 4050 Vautour. The higher thrust ASSa.7 at 11,000 lbf (49 kN) was the first British engine to be rated above 10,000 lbf (44 kN) and it powered the Gloster Javelin FAW Mk.7, Handley Page Victor B.Mk.1 and a prototype Swiss fighter-bomber, the FFA P-16.

The Sapphire compressor operated well, free from surging, over its complete RPM range without the need for variable inlet guide vanes (VIGV) or bleed. However, early compressor stages suffered from fatigue due to rotating stall at low RPM and various fixes, such as lacing wire, were incorporated. Curtiss-Wright introduced variable ramps on the Wright J65 at the entry to the compressor to prevent the stalling and blade excitation. Armstrong-Siddeley tested a similar solution on the Sapphire but incorporated blade changes instead to reduce the blade response to the stalling.

Caygill states that one of the most serious problems encountered throughout the life of the Gloster Javelin was caused by "centre-line closure" on the Sapphire engine. Flying through thick cloud could cause the compressor case to shrink and rub the blades causing catastrophic engine failures and loss of the aircraft. "Centre-line closure" also caused a Sapphire failure on a Victor B.1.

An afterburner with limited boost was required for the Javelin's ASSa.7, making it the ASSa.7LR. 12% boost was required at high altitudes to regain the bomber intercept performance that had been lost carrying the new de Havilland Firestreak missiles. Afterburners with a low boost requirement were sometimes known as "wee-heat". Other low-boost reheats have included the "tailpipe augmentation"(TPA) on the F-86H (J73) with +10% at take-off and "Bristol Simplified Reheat"(BSR), with about 16% boost at take-off, tested on Derwent V, Orenda, Olympus and Orpheus engines.

== Variants ==
MVSa.1
Ministry of Supply designation of the original Metropolitan-Vickers F.9 Sapphire, derived from the Metropolitan-Vickers F.2/4 Beryl. Design work on this much larger engine started in 1943.
ASSa.3
Completed a 150-hour Service Type Test in November 1951 at a sea level rating of 7,500 lbf (33.36 kN) at an s.f.c. of 0.91
ASSa.4
ASSa.5
Early Armstrong Siddeley developed Sapphire engines.
ASSa.5R
Reheated engines fitted to the English Electric P.1A.
ASSa.6
Later engines developed for the Gloster Javelin FAW Mk.1, Hawker Hunter F.Mk.2, F.Mk.5 and the prototype Sud Ouest SO 4050 Vautour
ASSa.7
Rated at 11,000 lbf (49 kN), powering the Gloster Javelin FAW Mk.7, Handley Page Victor B.Mk.1 and the prototype FFA P-16.
ASSa.7LR
Engines with a 12% augmentation reheat system for use above 20,000 ft (6,100 m), powering the Gloster Javelin FAW Mk.8.
Wright J65

Licence production in the United States by Wright Aeronautical
ASSa.8
ASSa.9
ASSa.12
Sapphire 101
(ASSa.6)
Sapphire 104
(ASSa.12)
Sapphire 202
(ASSa.7)

== Applications ==
- English Electric Lightning P.1A prototypes, as Avon engines were not ready
- FFA P-16
- Gloster Javelin - Sa.6 and Sa.7
- Handley Page Victor B.1, the B.2 variant had RR Conway
- Hawker Hunter F.2 and F.5
- SNCASO SO.4050 Vautour (3rd prototype)

== Engines on display ==
An Armstrong Siddeley Sapphire is on static display at the Midland Air Museum, Coventry Airport, Warwickshire.

Very few Armstrong Siddeley Sapphire engines exist, other known examples are preserved at the Jet Age Museum in Gloucester, England, and the Malta Aviation Museum at Ta' Qali.

== Specifications (ASSa.7) ==
Data from Jane's.

==== General characteristics ====
- Type: Turbojet
- Length: 125.2 in (3,180 mm)
- Diameter: 37.55 in (954 mm)
- Dry weight: 3,050 lb (1,383 kg)

==== Components ====
- Compressor: 13-stage axial flow
- Combustors: Annular with 24 hockey-stick vaporisers
- Turbine: Two-stage
- Fuel type: Aviation kerosene
- Oil system: Flood feed, minimum oil pressure 12 psi (83 kPa), tank capacity 18 imp pt (10 L)

==== Performance ====
- Maximum thrust: 11,000 lbf (49 kN) at sea level at 8,000 rpm
- Specific fuel consumption: 0.885 lb/hr/lb (90.214 kg/kN/hr) at take-off rating
- Thrust-to-weight ratio: 3.607

== See also ==
Related development

- Wright J65

Comparable engines

- General Electric J73
- Ishikawajima-Harima J3
- Rolls-Royce Avon
- SNECMA Atar
- Tumansky R-13
- Tumansky R-25

Related lists

- List of aircraft engines
