= Segi Point Airfield =

World War II airfield in the Solomon Islands

- Segi Point, New Georgia
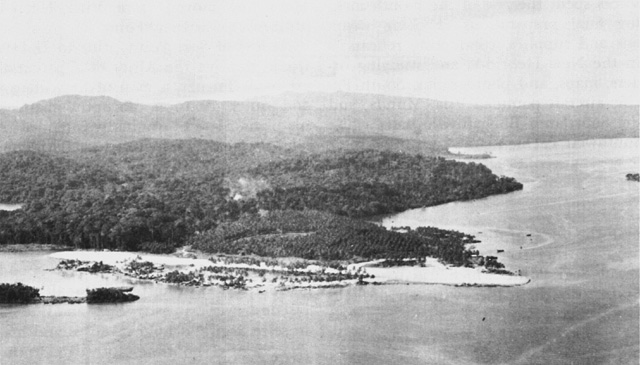
- Aerial view of Segi Point Airfield

Site information
- Type: Military Airfield
- Controlled by: United States Navy
- Condition: abandoned

Location
- Coordinates: 08°34′42.6″S 157°52′33.6″E

Site history
- Built: 1943
- Built by: Seabees
- In use: 1943-4
- Materials: Coral
- Battles/wars: New Georgia Campaign; Bougainville Campaign; Operation Cartwheel

Segi Point Airfield is a former World War II airfield on New Georgia in the Solomon Islands archipelago.

== History ==
=== World War II ===
The Segi (Seghe) Point area was the base of the British Commonwealth coastwatcher, Donald Gilbert Kennedy, who had monitored Japanese shipping and aircraft (reporting by radio) and also rescued American airman who were shot down in the territory held by the Japanese. In May and June 1943 Japanese patrols moved into the Segi Point area. The Segi Point area was secured by the 4th Marine Raider Battalion on 30 June 1943 in the opening phase of the New Georgia Campaign. The 20th, 24th and 47th Naval Construction Battalions landed with the Marines and immediately began construction of a fighter airstrip. Bad weather and poor soil conditions delayed construction, but by 18 July a coral-surfaced 3,300 feet (1,000 m) by 150 feet (46 m) runway was ready for use. By the end of July taxiways and revetments had been completed. In August the runway was widened to 200 feet (61 m) and two 42,000 US gallons (160,000 L; 35,000 imp gal) gas tanks had been constructed and by September, 52 hardstands had been completed.

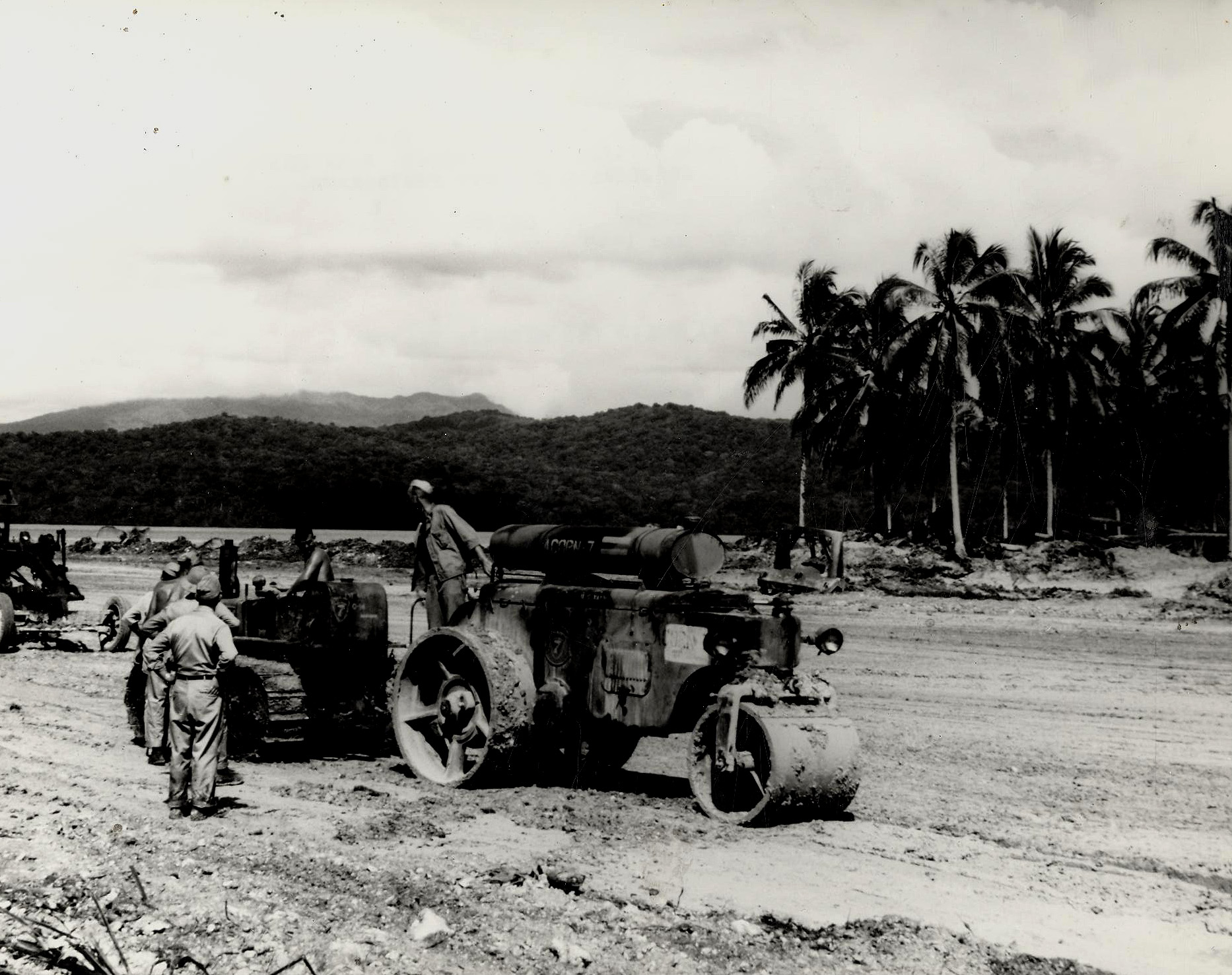
Seebees constructing Segi Point Airfield

USAAF units based at Segi Point included:

- 44th Pursuit Squadron operating P-40s

US Navy units based at Segi Point included:

- VB-305 operating SBDs
- VF-33 operating F6Fs
- VF-38 operating F6Fs
- VF-40 operating F6Fs

=== Postwar ===
The airfield remains in use today as Seghe Airport.

== See also ==
- Barakoma Airfield
- Munda Airport
- Ondonga Airfield
- United States Army Air Forces in the South Pacific Area
