= Barakoma Airfield =

- Barakoma, Vella Lavella
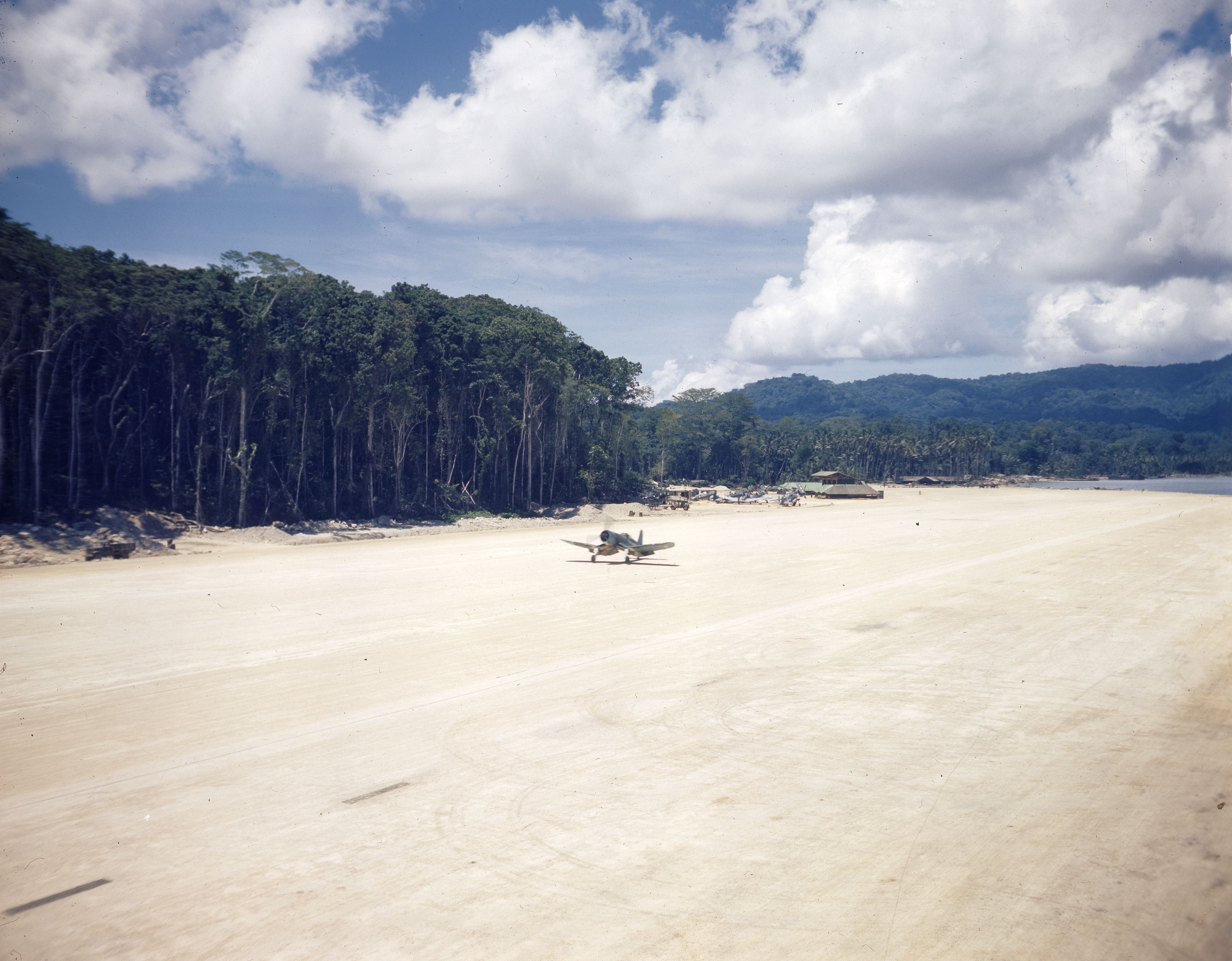

Site information
- Type: Military Airfield
- Controlled by: United States Marine Corps
- Condition: abandoned

Location
- Coordinates: 07°54′46.8″S 156°42′21.6″E

Site history
- Built: 1943
- Built by: Seebees
- In use: 1943-4
- Materials: Coral
- Battles/wars: Bougainville Campaign; Operation Cartwheel

Barakoma Airfield is a former World War II airfield on Vella Lavella in the Solomon Islands archipelago.

== History ==
=== World War II ===
The U.S. 35th Infantry Regiment landed on Vella Lavella on 15 August 1943 as part of the Solomon Islands campaign. The 58th Naval Construction Battalions landed with the Army and began building support facilities despite frequent Japanese air attacks. In August 1943 the Seebees surveyed and cleared a site for an airfield and began building a coral-surfaced 4,000 feet (1,200 m) by 200 feet (61 m) fighter runway. Airfield facilities such as a signal tower, operations room, aviation-gasoline tanks, and camp for operating personnel, were completed in September and the first landing was made on 24 September. By November 1943 an aviation-gasoline tank farm of six 1,000-barrel tanks, with a sea-loading line was operational.

US Navy units based at Barakoma included:

- VF-40 operating F6Fs

USMC units based at Barakoma included:

- VMF-212 operating F4Fs
- VMF-214 operating F4Us
- VMF-215 operating F4Us
- VMF-221 operating F4Us
- VMF-321 operating F4Us
- VMF(N)-531 operating PV-1 Venturas

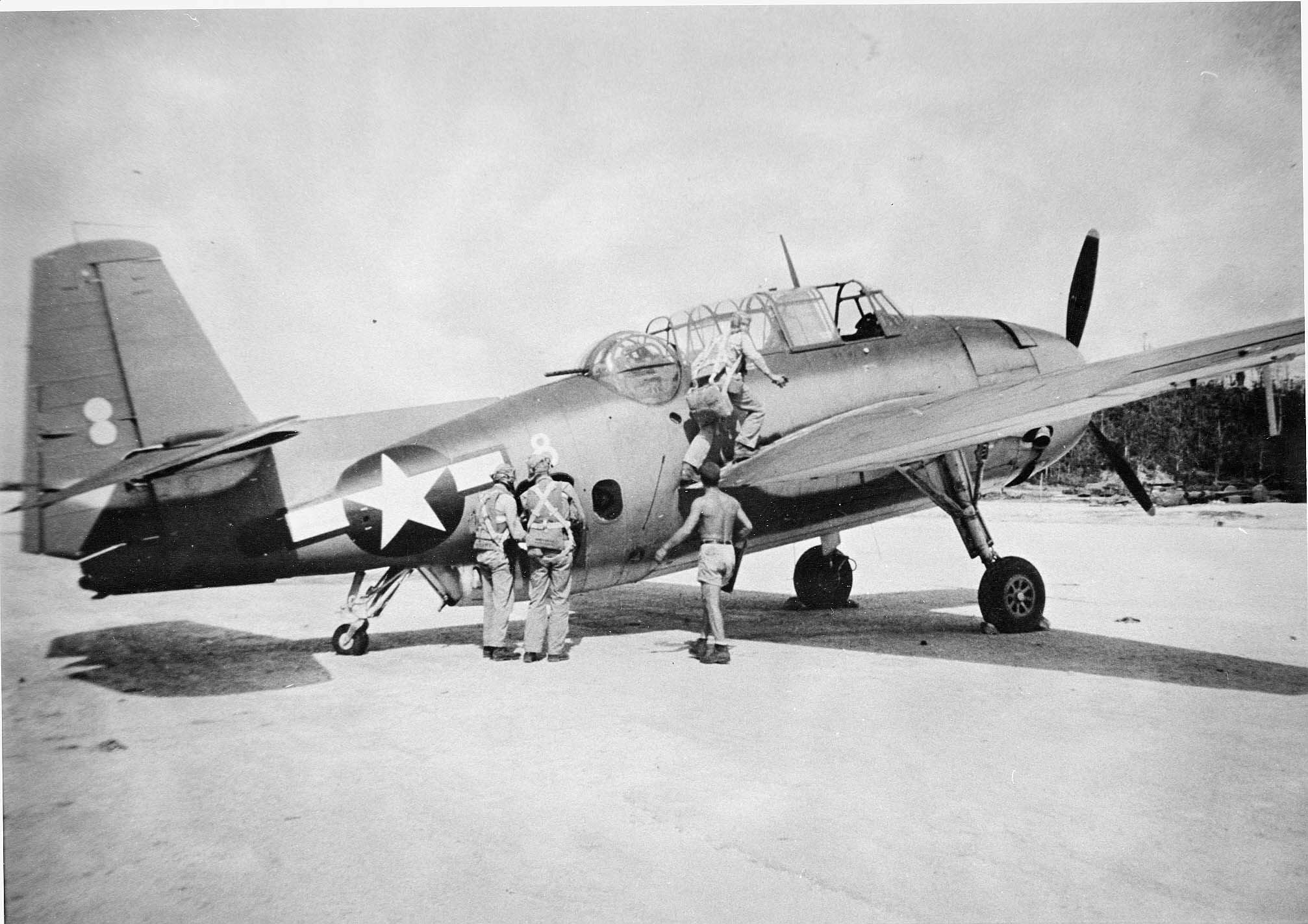
TBF at Barakoma

On 15 June 1944 the airfield was abandoned and all salvageable materials were dismantled and removed by 12 July 1944.

=== Postwar ===
The airfield is overgrown with vegetation.

== See also ==
- Munda Airport
- Ondonga Airfield
- Segi Point Airfield
- United States Army Air Forces in the South Pacific Area
