= Dale Snodgrass =

United States Navy pilot (1949–2021)

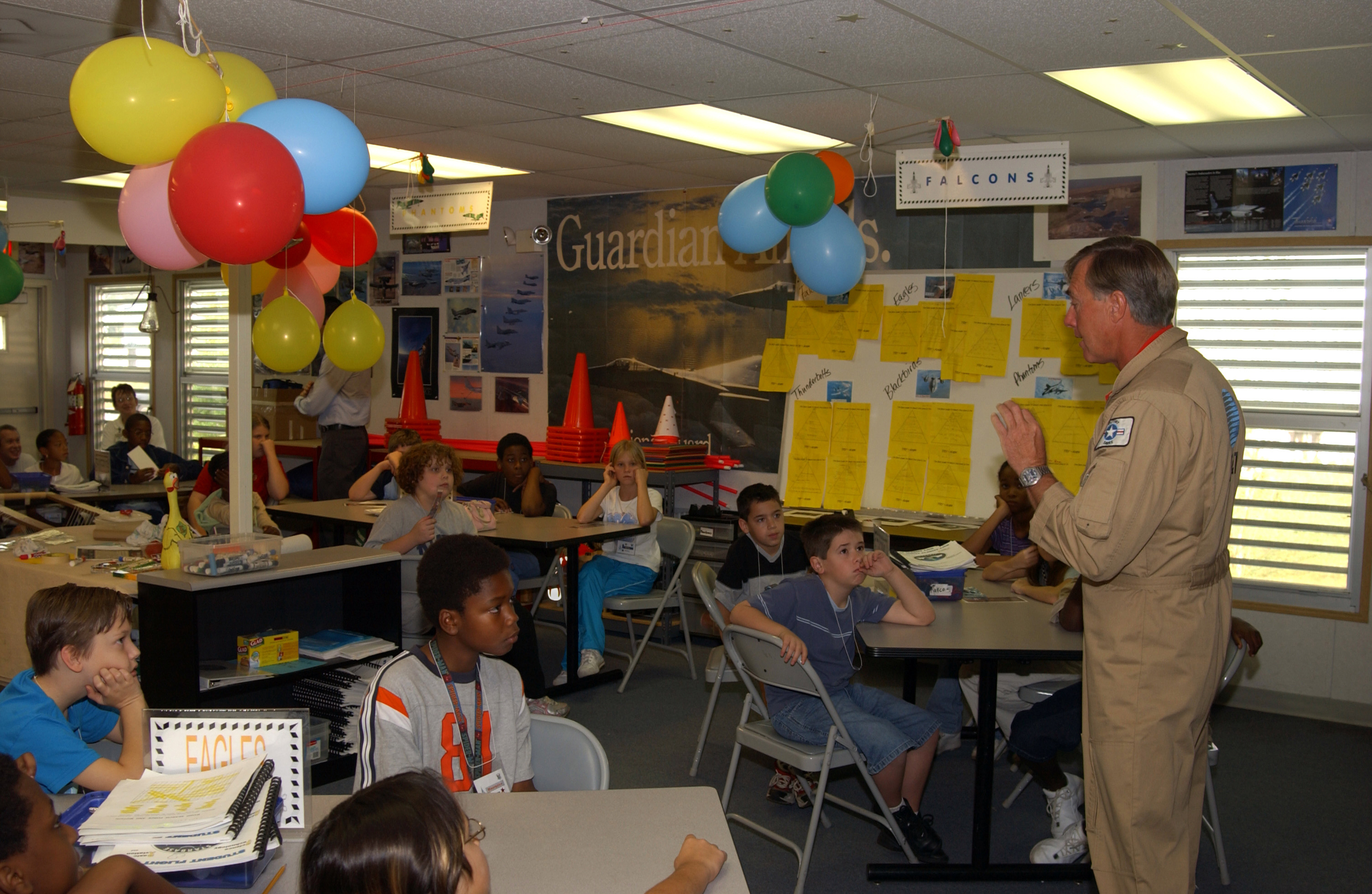
- Born: May 13, 1949; Long Island, New York, US
- Died: July 24, 2021 (aged 72); Lewiston, Idaho, US
- Spouse: Cynthia West
- Children: 2
- Military career
- Allegiance: United States
- Branch: United States Navy
- Service years: 1973–1999
- Rank: Captain
- Nickname: "Snort"
- Commands: Fighter Squadron 33; Fighter Wing, U.S. Atlantic Fleet
- Conflicts: Gulf War
- Awards: Legion of Merit (3); Bronze Star Medal; Meritorious Service Medal (2); Air Medal (3); Navy and Marine Corps Commendation Medal (3); Others (see below)
- Website: Official website

Dale Snodgrass (May 13, 1949 – July 24, 2021) was a United States Navy aviator and air show performer who according to the Spokane Spokesman-Review was considered one of the greatest fighter pilots of all time.

Snodgrass was the "highest time Tomcat pilot," after having accumulated more than 4,800 hours in the F-14 and more than 1,200 arrested carrier landings, both more than any other pilot.

He was called "The Real Top Gun" or the real "Maverick" in reference to Tom Cruise's character in the movie, Top Gun.

== Early life and education ==
Snodgrass was born on Long Island, New York, to Reuben and Virginia Snodgrass. His father had been a World War II Marine aviator flying F4U Corsairs in the Pacific and later became a Grumman engineering test pilot. Snodgrass grew up in Lake Ronkonkoma, New York with his three sisters.

After high school, Snodgrass attended the University of Minnesota on a Navy ROTC scholarship and was also an All-American swimmer. Snodgrass graduated with a Bachelor of Science in biology in 1972.

== Military career ==
Snodgrass graduated first in his flight school in 1974. He was the first student selected to begin flying the F-14 Tomcat immediately after flight school.

Snodgrass' callsign in the Navy was "Snort".

In 1978 he attended the United States Navy Strike Fighter Tactics Instructor program, commonly known as "Top Gun", the Navy Fighter Weapons School. He later became a Top Gun instructor.

In 1985, the US Navy selected Snodgrass as "Fighter Pilot of the Year." The following year, Snodgrass reportedly did a little bit of the flying in the film Top Gun. As the best F-14 pilot in 1986, Grumman Aerospace awarded Snodgrass "Topcat of the Year." He later became a demonstration pilot, a role he kept for 10 years.

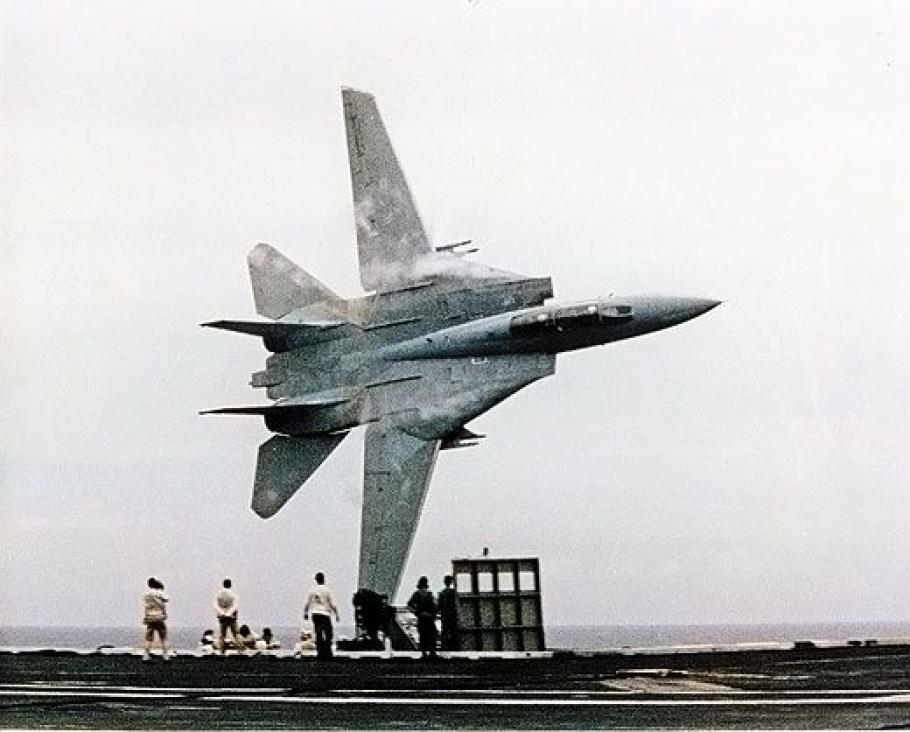
Snodgrass' famous "banana pass" over the USS America in 1988

Snodgrass was famous for his low-level flybys. During the summer of 1988, Snodgrass performed a low-level "banana pass" or a knife-edge pass during an air show for a Dependent's Day Cruise for the families of carrier personnel aboard the USS America aircraft carrier. A photo of the pass was captured, taken by a Navy photographer, and it is considered one of the most famous aviation photos of all time. Snodgrass' wings are vertical, and the F-14 appears to be very close to the ship and the crew members seen in the foreground.

During Operation Desert Storm, Snodgrass was the commanding officer of Fighter Squadron 33. Leading 34 missions as overall strike or fighter lead in 12 operational fighter squadron and fighter wing tours, he was awarded honors including a Bronze Star for leadership and valor. In September 1994, he became commander of all US Navy F-14 Tomcats for Fighter Wing, U.S. Atlantic Fleet.

In the Navy, Snodgrass was considered the "highest time Tomcat pilot," logging more than 8,000 hours of flight time including more than 4,800 hours in the F-14 and more than 1,200 arrested carrier landings, both more than any other pilot. He was the first Tomcat pilot to complete carrier qualifications, both night and day, without any fleet experience.

=== Post-military career ===
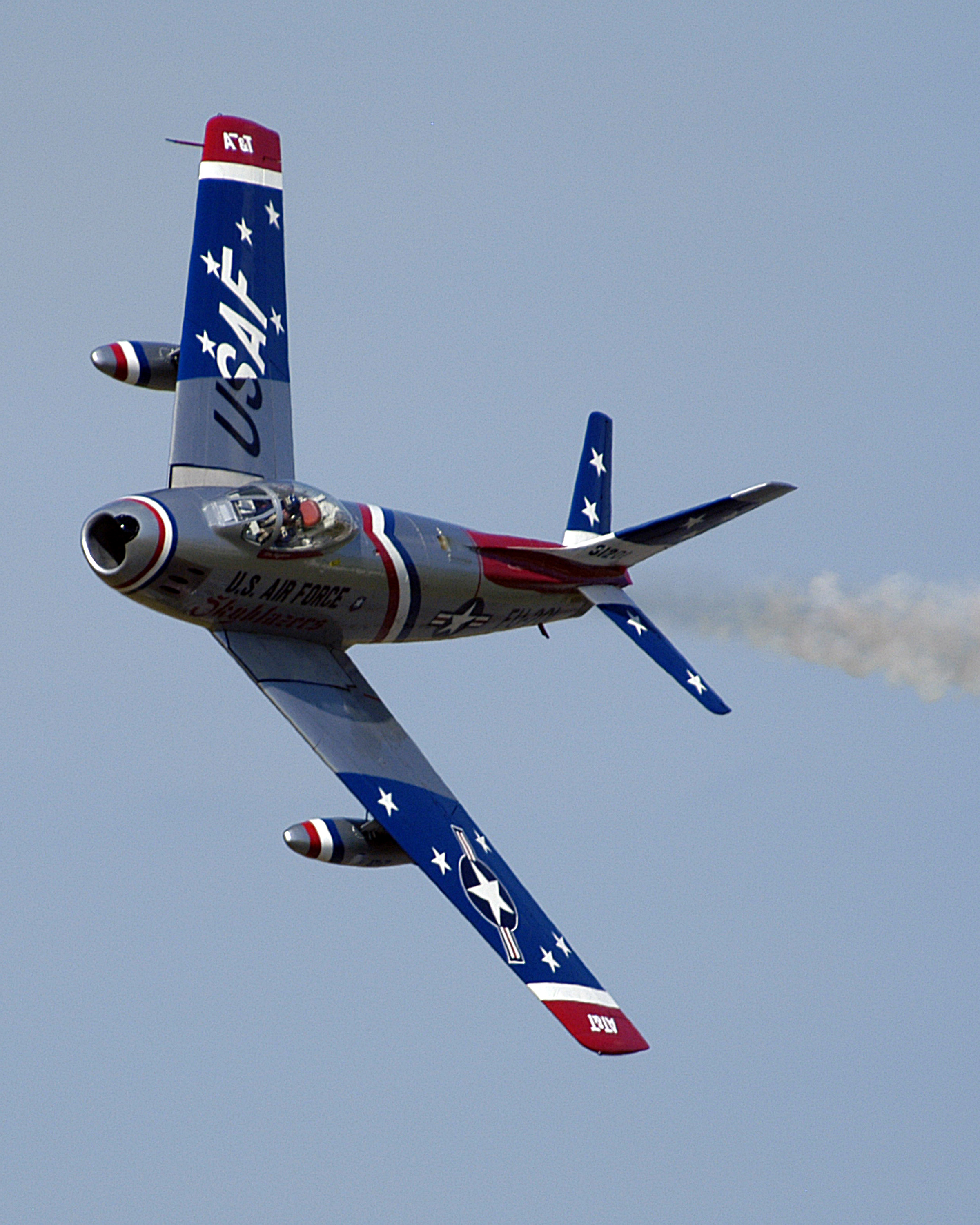
Snodgrass in his Korean War-era F-86 Sabre, 2004

Snodgrass retired from the Navy in June 1999 after 26 years.

Snodgrass had performed in over 850 airshows over the course of 20 years. Having flown F-14 demos at airshows for 14 years, he has additionally qualified in other warbirds, like the F-86 Sabre, P-51 Mustang, F4U Corsair, T-6 Texan, MiG-17, MiG-21, A-4 Skyhawk, and F-5 Tiger. He has been designated as one of only ten USAF Heritage Flight pilots.

At Draken International, Snodgrass served as their Chief Pilot as well as the Director of Deployed Operations and Congressional Liaison. He also taught formation flying and aerobatics to warbird owners, and provided upset training for corporate pilots and MS-760 Paris Jet customers.

== Personal life ==
Snodgrass lived in St. Augustine, Florida. and was married to Cynthia (née West). From a prior marriage, Dale had two daughters and four granddaughters.

=== Death ===
On July 24, 2021, Snodgrass was killed when his SIAI-Marchetti SM.1019 crashed while taking off at the Lewiston–Nez Perce County Airport in Lewiston, Idaho. Snodgrass was the sole occupant of the aircraft. The National Transportation Safety Board (NTSB) has cited the pilot’s failure to remove the flight control lock as the probable cause of the crash.

=== Legacy ===
In June 2022, the National Naval Aviation Museum in Pensacola, Florida dedicated its Ready Room display and an exhibit to Snodgrass.

== Awards and decorations ==
During his military career, Snodgrass received a number of decorations including a Bronze Star for Leadership and Valor.

Naval Aviator insignia
Legion of Merit w/2 gold award stars	Bronze Star w/Combat V	Meritorious Service Medal w/ 1 gold award star
Air Medal, 3, one with Combat V	Navy and Marine Corps Commendation Medal w/Combat V and bronze award star	Navy and Marine Corps Achievement Medal
Joint Meritorious Unit Award	Navy Unit Commendation w/bronze award star	Meritorious Unit Commendation
Navy E Ribbon, 2 awards	National Defense Service Medal	Armed Forces Expeditionary Medal w/ bronze award star
Southwest Asia Service Medal	Humanitarian Service Medal	Navy and Marine Corps Sea Service Deployment Ribbon w/2 award stars
