= VF-33 =

Fighter Squadron 33
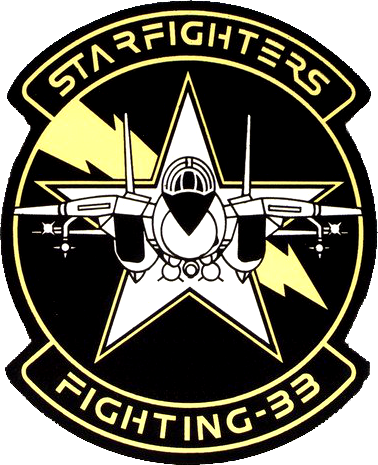
- VF-33 insignia
- Active: 6 August 1942 - 19 November 1945; 12 October 1948 - 1 October 1993
- Country: United States
- Branch: United States Navy
- Type: Fighter
- Nicknames: Tarsiers (1948-1958, 1961-1981); Astronauts (1958-1961); Starfighters (1981-1993)

Aircraft flown
- Fighter: F4U-4 Corsair; F9F-6 Cougar; FJ-3/-3M Fury; F11F-1 Tiger; F-8B/E Crusader; F-4B/J Phantom II; F-14A Tomcat

Fighter Squadron 33 (VF-33) was an aviation unit of the United States Navy. Originally established on 11 October 1948 it was disestablished on 1 October 1993. It was the second U.S. Navy squadron to be designated VF-33.

== VF-33 History ==
=== Korean War ===
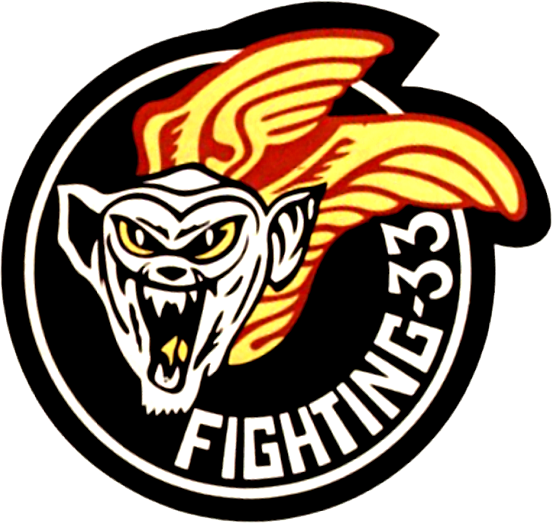
The VF-33 Tarsiers patch featuring "Minky", a tarsier.

The squadron was originally equipped with the Chance-Vought F4U-4 Corsair. It was assigned to Carrier Air Group Three (CVG-3) and made two deployments on the aircraft carrier USS Leyte. The first was to the Mediterranean Sea in mid-1950 quickly followed by a combat deployment to Korea from September 1950 to February 1951. For its action in the Korean War VF-33 earned the Navy Unit Citation. The squadron called themselves the "Tarsiers", after a fierce primate. The squadron affectionately called their tarsier "Minky".

=== Jet transition ===
Following its deployment to Korea VF-33 returned to the U.S. East Coast and transitioned to the F9F-6 Cougar. The squadron was assigned to Carrier Air Group Six (CVG-6) and deployed to the Mediterranean Sea aboard the USS Midway in 1954. After this tour the Tarsiers again transitioned to the FJ-3 Fury and made three deployments in 1956 and 1957 to the Atlantic Ocean and Mediterranean Sea, this time aboard the carriers USS Lake Champlain, USS Leyte, and USS Intrepid. Aboard Intrepid VF-33 took part in the NATO exercise Operation Strikeback.

In 1958 VF-33 transitioned to the supersonic F-11 Tiger and was renamed Astronauts. As part of CVG-6 VF-33 made two tours to the Mediterranean Sea aboard the Intrepid.

In early 1961 the squadron changed already to its fourth jet fighter in seven years, the F8U-1E Crusader, and changed its name back to Tarsiers. VF-33 took its F8U-1E (F-8B) again aboard Intrepid to the Mediterranean in 1961-62 and was then equipped with the F8U-2NE (F-8E) version. The squadron was then deployed aboard the USS Enterprise, to the Mediterranean Sea in August 1962. However, Enterprise was recalled in October to reinforce the naval blockade of Cuba during the Cuban Missile Crisis. In 1963 Enterprise and CVW-6 were again deployed to the United States Sixth Fleet, before taking part in Operation Sea Orbit in 1964. This was the around-the-world cruise of the United States Navy's Task Force One, consisting of USS Enterprise, USS Long Beach, and USS Bainbridge. This all-nuclear-powered unit steamed 56,606 km (30,565 nm) unrefuelled around the world for sixty-five days.

In 1964 the unit transitioned to the F-4 Phantom II and would fly the Phantom for the next seventeen years alongside its sister squadron VF-102. The first VF-33 Phantom was the F-4B, which they flew until 1967 at which time they moved up to the F-4J which featured better radar, higher thrust engines, slatted tailplanes, extra fuel cells and a larger main wheels to handle the increased weight. Between 1965 and 1968 Carrier Air Wing Six made the shakedown cruise and three deployments aboard the USS America.

=== Vietnam operations ===
VF-33 deployed to the Vietnam War on board USS America from 10 April to 16 December 1968. During their time in the theatre VF-33 would drop over three million pounds of ordnance, flying 4000 combat hours over a period of 5 months. On 4 June F-4J #155554 was hit by antiaircraft fire, the pilot LT Eric Brice was killed in action, body not recovered, while the Radar Intercept Officer ejected successfully and was rescued. On 18 June F-4J #155546 was hit by a SAM-2, both crewmen ejected successfully and were rescued. On 10 July a squadron aircraft downed a Vietnam People's Air Force MiG-21, the first air-to-air kill by an East Coast Fighter Squadron over North Vietnam. On 24 July F-4J #155551 was hit by anti-aircraft fire, both crewmen ejected successfully and were rescued.

=== Middle East crises ===
After their return, VF-33 was reassigned to Carrier Air Wing Seven, and made eight deployments aboard the USS Independence to the Mediterranean between 1969 and 1981.

In September 1970 Independence, USS Saratoga, and USS John F. Kennedy were deployed to the Middle East in case of any crisis evolving after the death of the Egyptian leader Gamal Abdel Nasser. A real crisis finally evolved in 1973 when Israel took heavy losses during the Yom Kippur War. To support Israel the U.S. initiated Operation Nickel Grass, which was an overt strategic airlift operation conducted by the United States to deliver weapons and supplies to Israel. Military Airlift Command shipped 22,325 tons of tanks, artillery, ammunition, and supplies in C-141 Starlifter and C-5 Galaxy transport aircraft between 12 October and 14 November 1973. The USAF planes only flew over international waters and were escorted by U.S. Navy fighters over the Mediterranean, provided by CVW-1 (on John F. Kennedy), CVW-6 (on USS Franklin D. Roosevelt) and CVW-7. The carriers operated about every 500 km, Independence operating as the easternmost carrier off Crete. The carriers also served as refueling stops for A-4E Skyhawk fighters, which were taken from U.S. Navy stocks to replace the losses of the Israeli Air Force.

VF-33 won several awards including the CNO Safety Award in 1969 and 1970 and during the 1975–1976 cruise they won the Golden Tailhook Award as the Navy recognised their skill at carrier landing. In February 1979 VF-33 had flown three years without accident. In early 1979 VF-33 also operated from the USS Dwight D. Eisenhower during that carrier's shakedown cruise.

=== Tomcat transition ===
In 1981 VF-33 transitioned to the F-14A Tomcat along with VF-102 and joined Carrier Air Wing One assigned to USS America. Until 1992 VF-33 made twelve deployments with CVW-1 aboard the America to the Atlantic Ocean, the Mediterranean and the Indian Ocean. Their first deployment was a grueling North Atlantic NATO deployment (Northern Wedding) between August and October 1982. VF-33 has used stars as part of their tail markings since the Crusader days and settled on a large star for their latter F-4 tenure and as the main symbol on the Tomcat. In 1987, they abandoned "Minky" and changed their name from Tarsiers to Starfighters, which was their radio callsign. The new patch featured a large star with a head-on view of a Tomcat. On 20 August 1985 VF-33 was the first squadron to complete 50 missile firings without a single failure.

=== Gulf of Sidra operations ===
In March 1986 VF-33 would bring their F-14s into a combat environment for the first time on board USS America with Carrier Air Wing 1 as they took part in Operation Attain Document in the Mediterranean Sea alongside the Saratoga and USS Coral Sea (CV-43). VF-33 engaged two Libyan MiG-25s with intent on shooting down the F-14s, but the Tomcats outmaneuvered the Libyans and ended behind the Libyan fighters, but the pilots did not have permission to open fire. Along with VF-102 they provided air cover during the operation as the carrier group moved into the Gulf of Sidra, which was claimed by Libya to be the Line of Death. Libya claimed its territorial waters extended across the entire Gulf of Sidra as opposed to the internationally recognised limit of 12 miles, and because of this claim, any airplane or ship within these waters was alleged to be in Libyan territory and liable to attack. US carriers occasionally challenged this assertion resulting in the first VF-41 Tomcat engagements with Libyan fighters in August 1981.

On 15 April 1986, after a terrorist attack on disco hall La Belle in Berlin, killing two American servicemen and a Turkish woman, President Ronald Reagan ordered airstrikes, called Operation El Dorado Canyon, against targets in Libya. F-111 bombers based at RAF Lakenheath and RAF Upper Heyford in the United Kingdom attacked targets in Tripoli while U.S. Navy A-6 Intruders from America and Coral Sea attacked targets in Benghazi. Navy and United States Marine Corps F/A-18 Hornets and Navy A-7’s attacked surface-to-air missile sites with AGM-88 HARM missiles. F-14 squadrons deployed in the Mediterranean, including VF-33, flew cover for the strike force. In 1986, VF-33 flew 895 continuous sorties without an abort.

In 1987 VF-33 made a short cruise on board the Navy’s newest carrier, the USS Theodore Roosevelt. After workups in 1988, VF-33 deployed on board America to the North Atlantic in February 1989, and again for a six-month Med-IO cruise from May through November. In February 1990 VF-33 made a two and a half month transit from San Diego to Philadelphia Naval Shipyard aboard USS Constellation (CV-64) providing fighter protection as the carrier made the journey around the southern tip of South America. VF-33 took part in several joint "Gringo-Gaucho" Exercises with South American nations during the transit.

=== Desert Storm operations ===
When Iraq invaded Kuwait in August 1990, four aircraft carriers were deployed to the region to provide carrier based air support for Operation Desert Shield. As the deadline for Iraqi withdrawal from Kuwait approached in January 1991, Theodore Roosevelt and America deployed to the region via the Suez Canal. VF-33 deployed with USS America arriving just as Operation Desert Storm commenced. America flew sorties alongside John F. Kennedy and Saratoga in the Red Sea before moving to the Persian Gulf to join USS Midway, USS Ranger (CV-61) and Theodore Roosevelt. VF-33 and VF-102 were the only Tomcat squadrons to fly missions from both the Red Sea and Persian Gulf during Operation Desert Storm.

=== Disestablishment ===
In 1993 a VF-33 airframe became the first F-14 to log 5,000 flight hours. When the Navy decided to assign only a single TARPS Tomcat squadron per carrier air wing after the end of the Cold War, VF-33 was not TARPS capable and despite the squadron's success in Desert Storm, it was disestablished on 1 October 1993. However, the tradition of VF-33 lives on through a very active alumni group that hosts a website and periodic reunions.

== Gallery ==
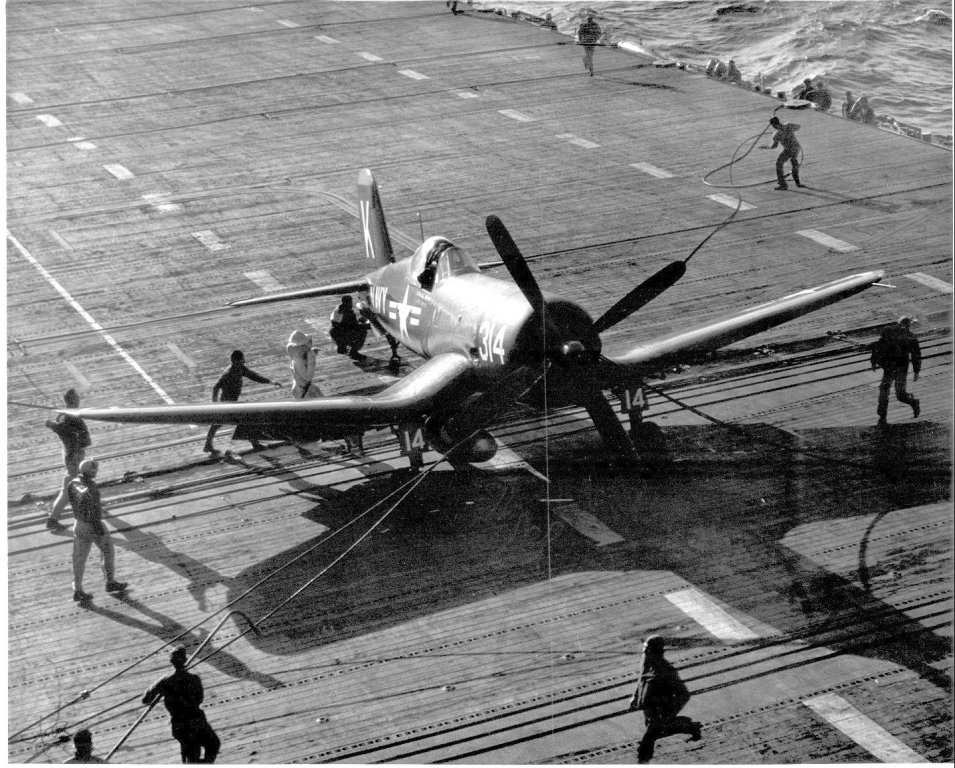
VF-33 F4U-4 on USS Leyte, in 1952

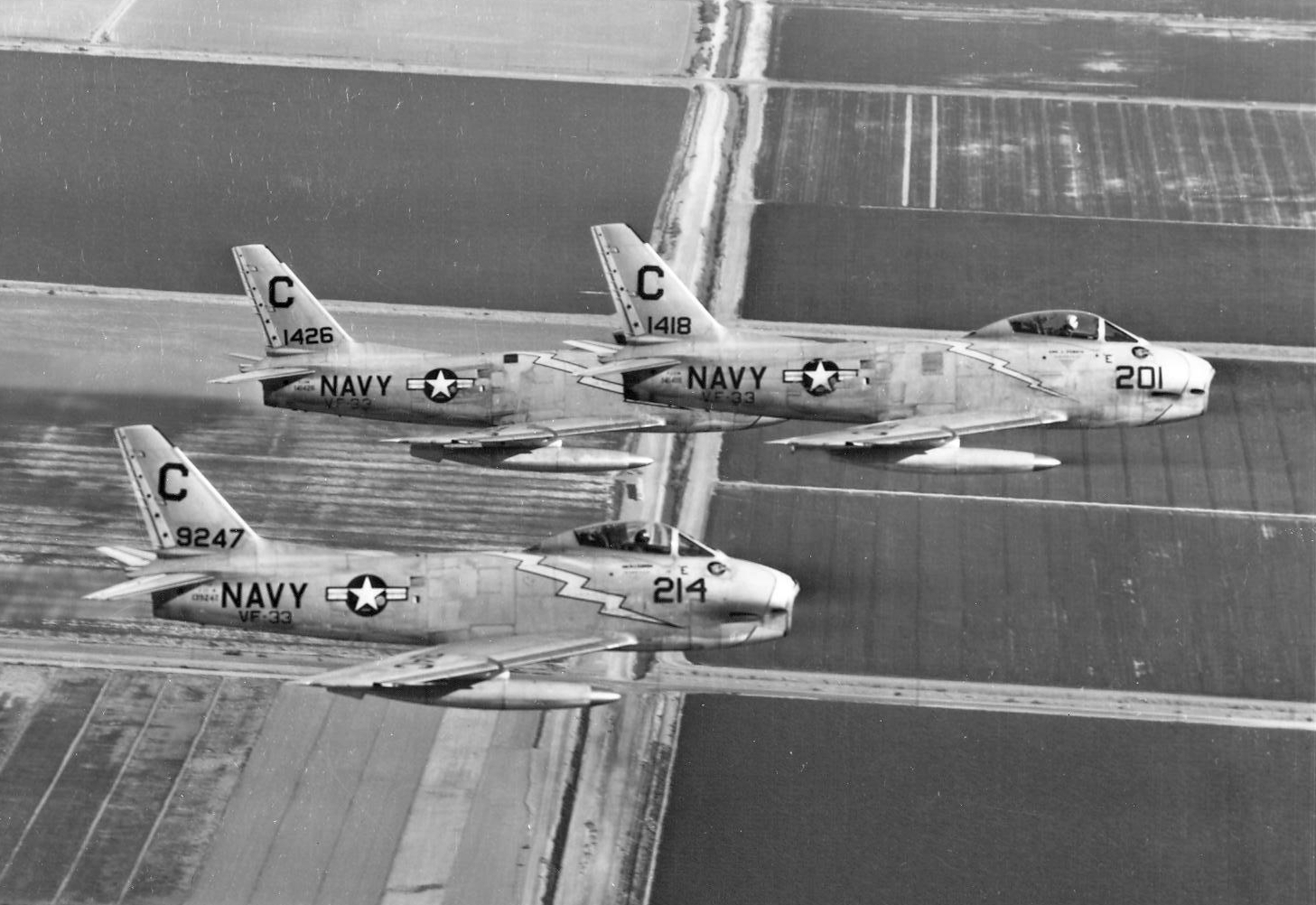
FJ-3 Furies of VF-33 near NAAF El Centro, 1957

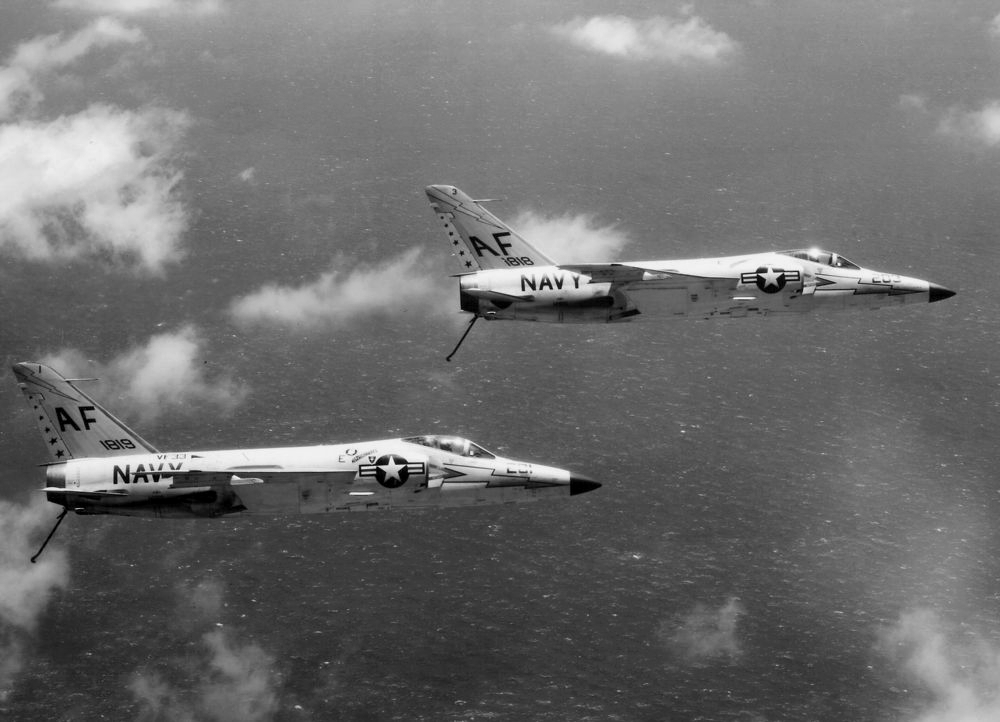
F11F-1 Tigers of VF-33, in 1959

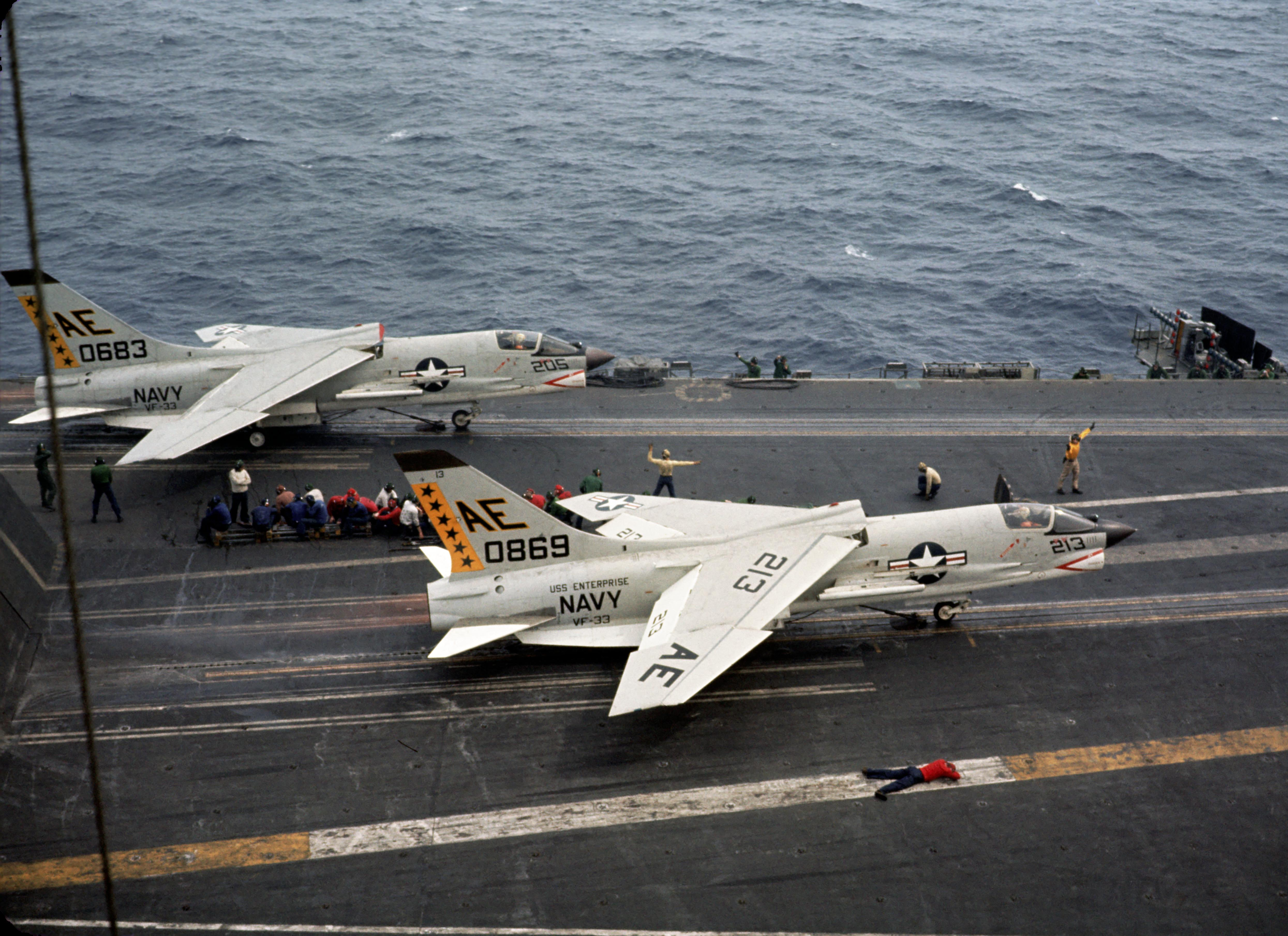
F-8E Crusaders of VF-33 aboard USS Enterprise, 1964

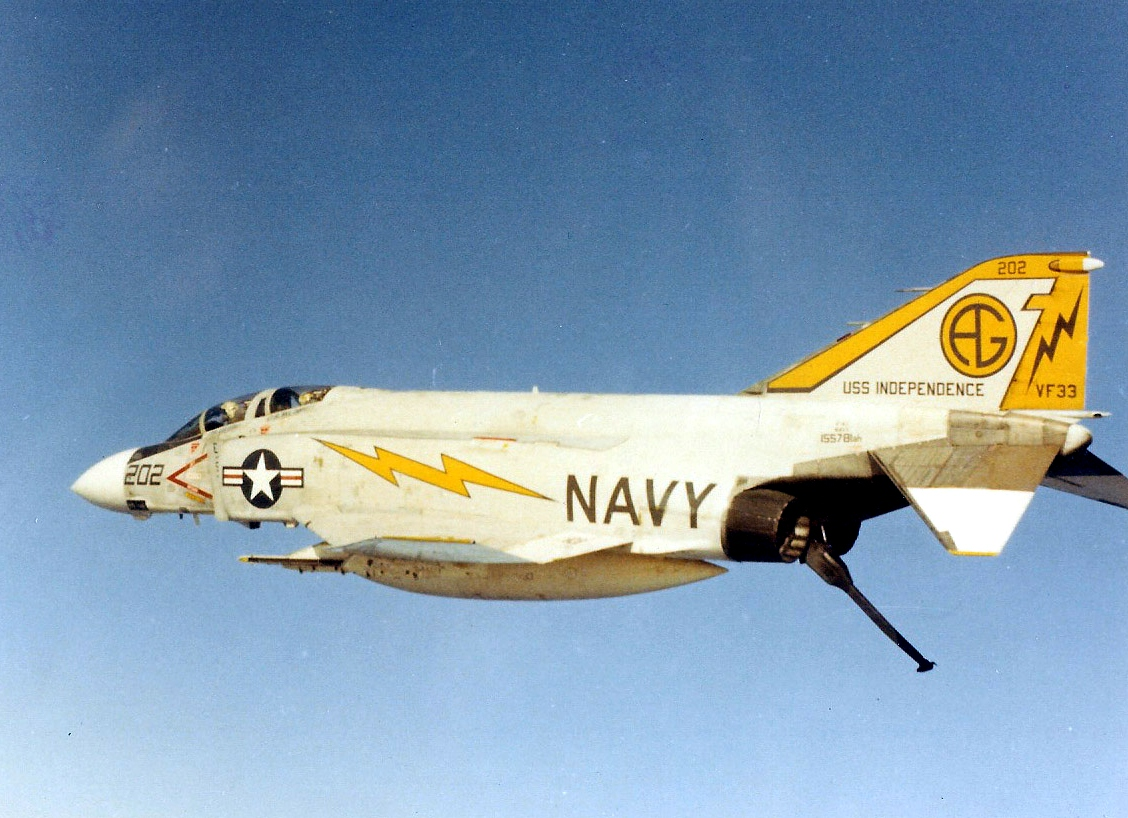
VF-33 F-4J in 1970

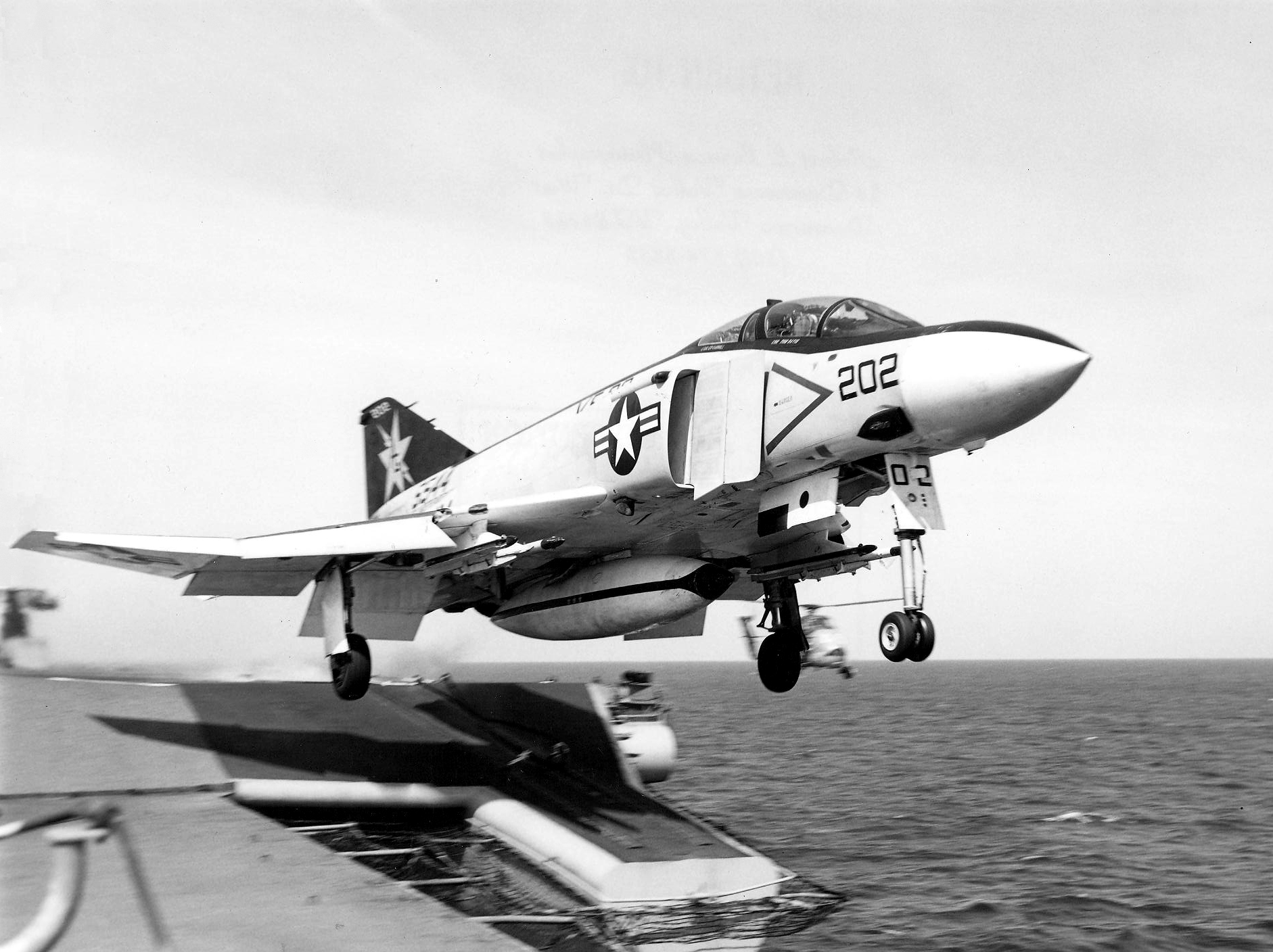
A F-4J is catapulted from HMS Ark Royal in 1975

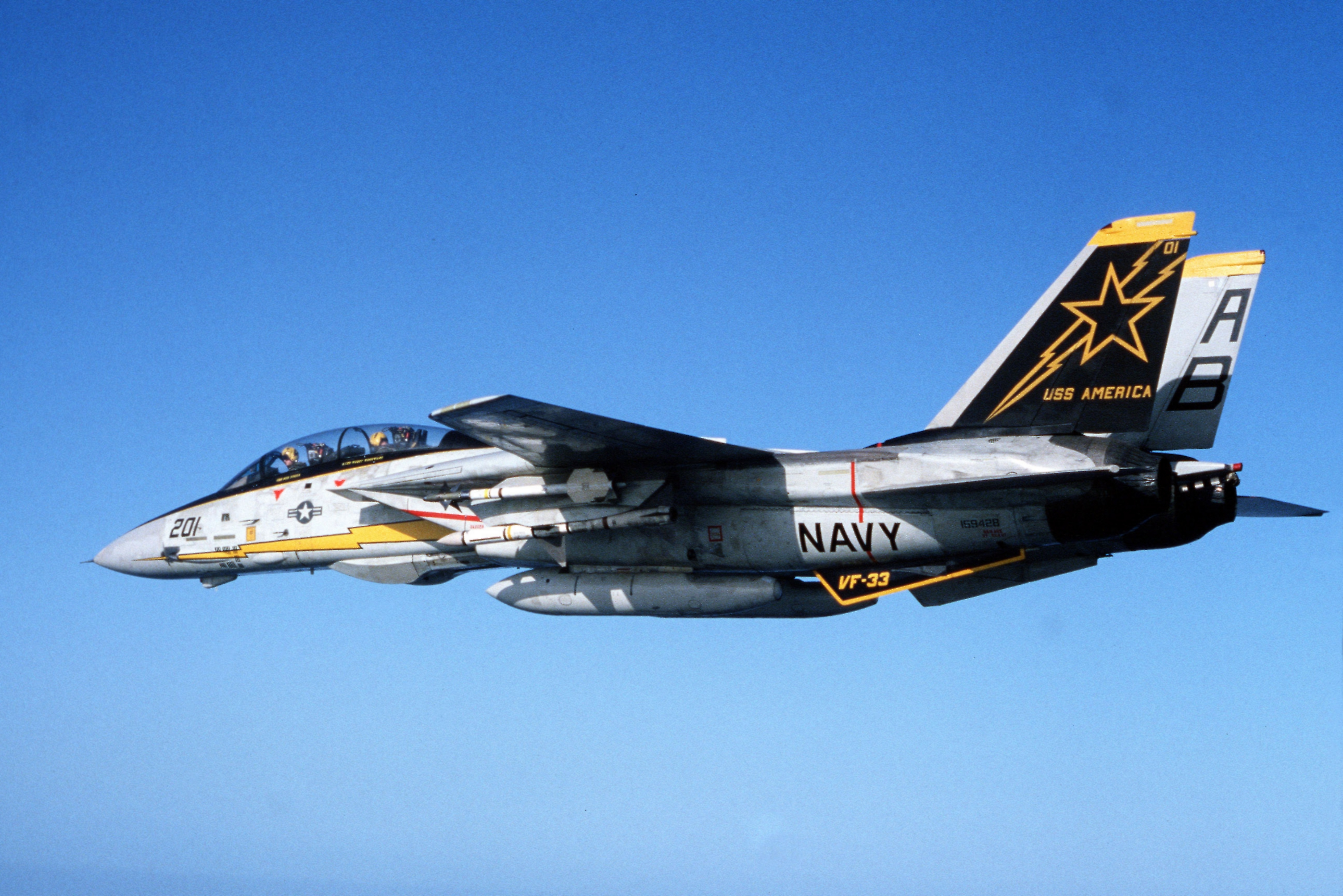
VF-33 F-14A in 1982

== See also ==
- History of the United States Navy
- List of inactive United States Navy aircraft squadrons
- List of United States Navy aircraft squadrons
- Dale Snodgrass
