= Lockheed U-2 =

American reconnaissance aircraft

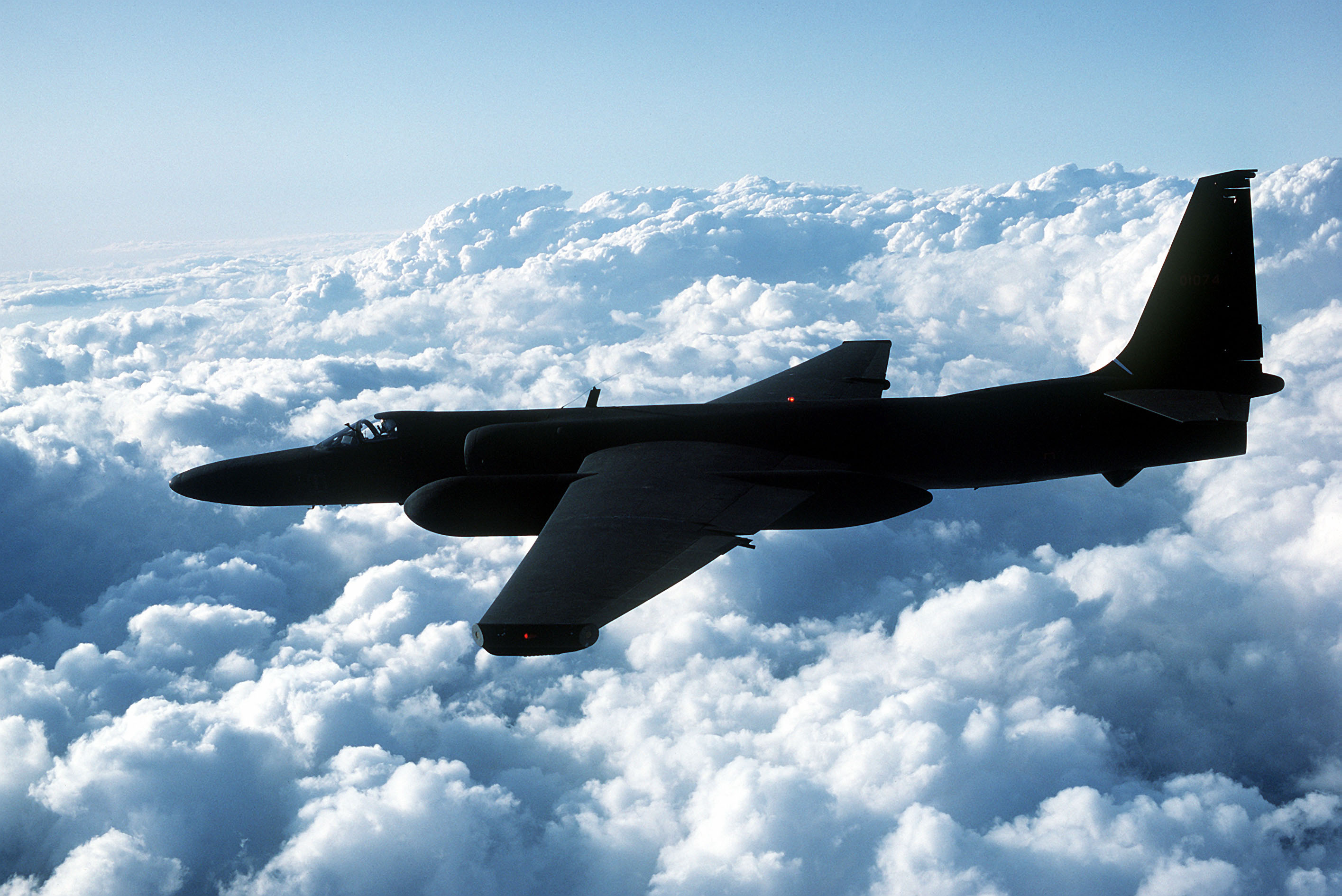
- A Lockheed U-2 in flight

General information
- Type: High-altitude reconnaissance aircraft
- National origin: United States
- Manufacturer: Lockheed Skunk Works
- Designer: Clarence "Kelly" Johnson
- Status: In service
- Primary users: United States Air Force Central Intelligence Agency (historical); NASA; Republic of China Air Force (historical)
- Number built: 104

History
- Manufactured: 1955–1989
- Introduction date: 1956
- First flight: 1 August 1955; 71 years ago

The Lockheed U-2, nicknamed the "Dragon Lady", is an American single-engine, high–altitude reconnaissance aircraft operated by the United States Air Force (USAF) and the Central Intelligence Agency (CIA) since the 1950s. Designed for all-weather, day-and-night intelligence gathering at altitudes above 70,000 feet (21,300 meters), the U-2 has played a pivotal role in aerial surveillance for decades.

Lockheed Corporation originally proposed the aircraft in 1953. It was approved in 1954, and its first test flight was in 1955. Between 1956 and 1962, U-2 aircraft conducted covert reconnaissance missions over the Soviet Union, China, Vietnam, and Cuba, gathering critical imagery intelligence throughout the Cold War. In 1960, CIA pilot Gary Powers was shot down in a U-2C over the Soviet Union by a surface-to-air missile (SAM). Major Rudolf Anderson Jr. was shot down in a U-2 during the Cuban Missile Crisis in 1962.

U-2s have taken part in post-Cold War conflicts in Afghanistan and Iraq, and supported several multinational NATO operations. Beyond tactical surveillance, U-2s have supported the development of electronic sensors, calibrated space-based instruments, conducted high-altitude atmospheric experiments, and tested line-of-sight and over-horizon communications systems. The U-2 is one of a handful of aircraft types to have served the USAF for over 50 years, along with the Boeing B-52, Boeing KC-135, Lockheed C-130 and Lockheed C-5. The newest models (TR-1, U-2R, U-2S) entered service in the 1980s, and the latest model, the U-2S, had a technical upgrade in 2012. The U-2 is currently operated by the USAF and NASA.

== Development ==
=== Background ===
After World War II, the U.S. military desired better strategic aerial reconnaissance to help determine Soviet capabilities and intentions, and to prevent being caught off-guard as it had been in the attack on Pearl Harbor. The Air Force commissioned the 'Beacon Hill Report' from Project Lincoln at the Massachusetts Institute of Technology, which was researched in 1951–1952 and delivered in 1952. The committee was led by Carl F. P. Overhage and was overseen by the Air Force's Gordon P. Saville, and included James Gilbert Baker and Edwin H. Land, who would design the specialized optics in the U-2.

During the early 1950s, the best intelligence the American government had on facilities deep inside the Soviet Union were World War II German Luftwaffe photographs taken during the war of territory west of the Ural Mountains, so overflights to take aerial photographs of the Soviet Union would be necessary. The committee suggested a plane with advanced optics, flying above 70,000 feet (21,300 m).

After 1950, Soviet air defenses consistently intercepted all aircraft near the country's borders—sometimes even those in Japanese airspace. Existing US reconnaissance aircraft, primarily bombers converted for reconnaissance duty such as the Boeing RB-47, were vulnerable to anti-aircraft artillery, missiles, and fighters. Richard Leghorn of the United States Air Force suggested that an aircraft that could fly at 60,000 feet (18,300 m) should be safe from the MiG-17, the Soviet Union's best interceptor aircraft, which could barely reach 45,000 feet (13,700 m). He and others believed that Soviet radar, which used American equipment provided during the war, could not track aircraft above 65,000 feet (19,800 m).

At the time, the highest-flying aircraft available to the US and its allies was the English Electric Canberra, which could reach 48,000 feet (14,600 m). The British had already produced the PR3 photo-reconnaissance variant, but the USAF asked for English Electric's help to further modify the American-licensed version of the Canberra, the Martin B-57, with long, narrow wings, new engines, and a lighter airframe to reach 67,000 feet (20,400 m). The U.S. Air Research and Development Command mandated design changes that made the aircraft more durable for combat, but the resulting RB-57D aircraft of 1955 could only reach 64,000 feet (19,500 m). The Soviet Union, unlike the United States and Britain, had improved radar technology after the war, and could track aircraft above 65,000 feet (19,800 m).

=== Lockheed proposal ===
It was thought that an aircraft that could fly at 70,000 feet (21,300 m) would be beyond the reach of Soviet fighters, missiles, and radar. Another Air Force officer, John Seaberg, wrote a request for proposal in 1953 for an aircraft that could reach 70,000 feet (21,300 m) over a target with 1,500 nmi (1,700 mi; 2,800 km) of operational radius. The USAF decided to solicit designs only from smaller aircraft companies that could give the project more attention. Under the code name "Bald Eagle", it gave contracts to Bell Aircraft, Martin Aircraft, and Fairchild Engine and Airplane to develop proposals for the new reconnaissance aircraft. Officials at Lockheed Aircraft Corporation heard about the project and decided to submit an unsolicited proposal. To save weight and increase altitude, Lockheed executive John Carter suggested that the design eliminate one landing gear and not attempt to meet combat load factors for the airframe. The company asked Clarence "Kelly" Johnson to come up with such a design. Johnson was Lockheed's best aeronautical engineer, responsible for the P-38 and the P-80. He was also known for completing projects ahead of schedule, working in a separate division of the company, informally called the "Skunk Works".

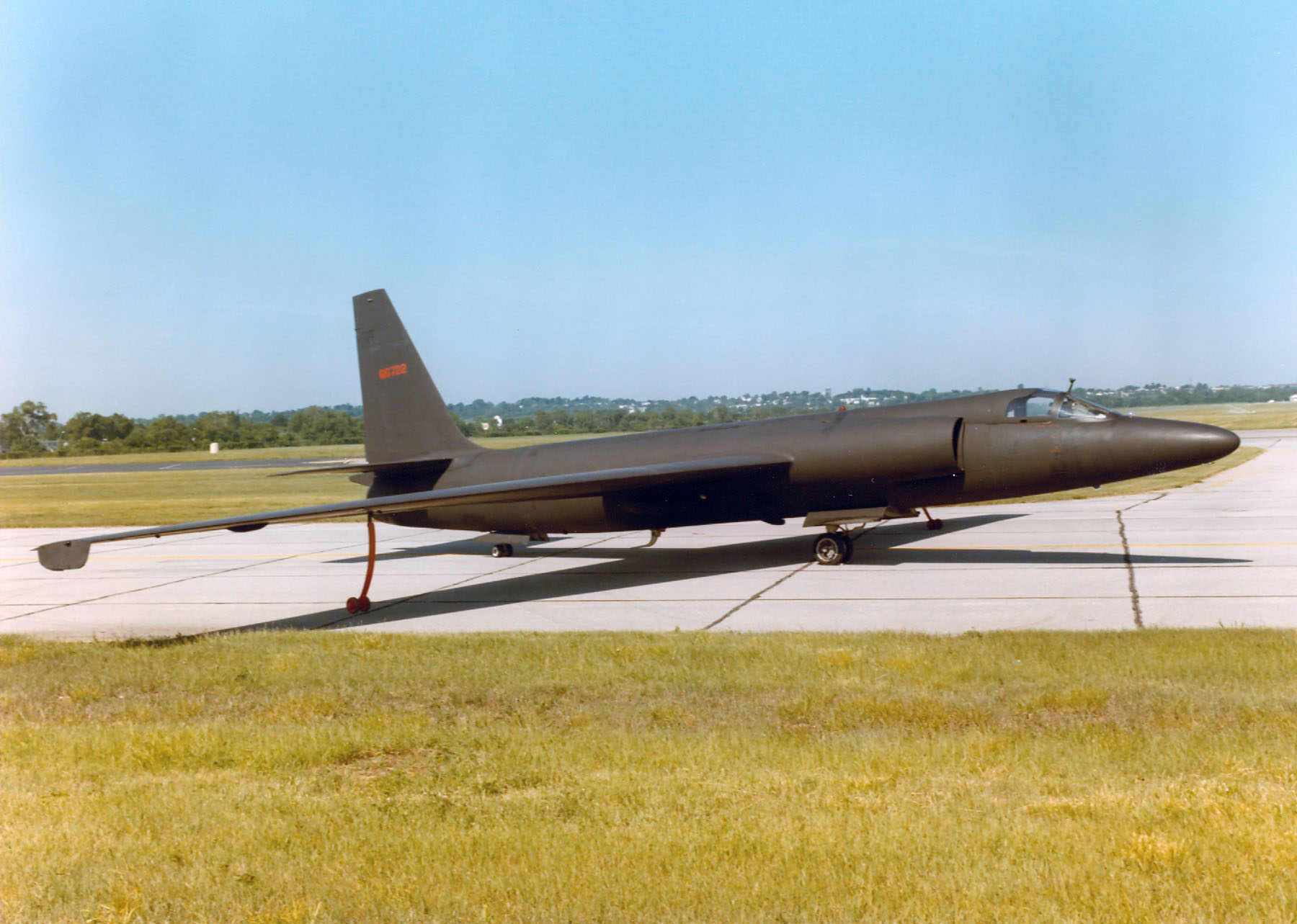
Original U-2A at USAF Museum

Johnson's design, named CL-282, was based on the Lockheed XF-104 with long, thin, slender wings and a shortened fuselage. The design was powered by the General Electric J73 engine and took off from a special cart and landed on its belly. It could reach an altitude of 73,000 feet (22,300 m) and had a 1,600 mi (1,400 nmi; 2,600 km) radius. The reconnaissance aircraft was essentially a jet-powered glider. In June 1954, the USAF rejected the design in favor of the Bell X-16 and the modified B-57. Reasons included the lack of landing gear, use of the J73 engine instead of the more proven Pratt & Whitney J57 used by the competing designs, and not using multiple engines, which the USAF believed to be more reliable. General Curtis LeMay of Strategic Air Command (SAC) walked out during a CL-282 presentation, saying that he was not interested in an airplane without wheels or guns. Having guns could pose a greater risk of exposing the aircraft during flight, and having missiles could expose it to thermal sensors.

=== Approval ===
Civilian officials including Trevor Gardner, an aide to Secretary of the Air Force Harold E. Talbott, were more positive about the CL-282 because of its higher potential altitude and smaller radar cross-section, and recommended the design to the Central Intelligence Agency's Office of Scientific Intelligence. At that time, the CIA depended on the military for overflights, and Director of Central Intelligence Allen Dulles favored human over technical intelligence-gathering methods. However, the Intelligence Systems Panel, a civilian group advising the USAF and CIA on aerial reconnaissance, had recognized by 1954 that the RB-57D would not meet the 70,000 feet (21,300 m) requirement that panel member Allen F. Donovan of Cornell Aeronautical Laboratory believed was necessary for safety. The CIA told the panel about the CL-282. The design elements that the USAF considered to be flaws (the single-engine and light load factor) appealed to Donovan. He was a sailplane enthusiast who believed that a sailplane was the type of high-altitude aircraft the panel was seeking.

Edwin Land, the developer of instant photography and another member of the panel, proposed to Dulles through Dulles' aide, Richard M. Bissell Jr., that his agency should fund and operate this aircraft. Land believed that if the military, rather than the CIA, operated the CL-282 during peacetime, such action could provoke a war. Although Dulles remained reluctant to have the CIA conduct its own overflights, Land and James Killian of MIT told President Eisenhower about the aircraft; Eisenhower agreed that the CIA should be the operator. Dulles finally agreed, but some USAF officers opposed the project because they feared it would endanger the RB-57D and X-16.

The USAF's Seaberg helped persuade his own agency to support the CL-282, albeit with the higher-performance J57 engine, and final approval for a joint USAF-CIA project (the first time the CIA dealt with sophisticated technology) came in November 1954. Lockheed had meanwhile become busy with other projects and had to be persuaded to accept the CL-282 contract after its approval.

=== Manufacture ===
Bissell became head of the project, which used covert funding; under the Central Intelligence Agency Act of 1949, the CIA's director is the only federal government employee who can spend "unvouchered" government money. Lockheed received a $22.5 million contract (equivalent to $270.4 million in 2025) in March 1955 for the first 20 aircraft, with the first $1.26 million ($15.14 million in 2025) mailed to Johnson's home in February 1955 to keep work going during negotiations. The company agreed to deliver the first aircraft by July of that year and the last by November 1956. It did so, and for $3.5 million ($41.4 million in 2025) under budget. The Flight Test Engineer in charge was Joseph F. Ware Jr.

Initial design and manufacturing was done at Lockheed's Skunk Works factory in Burbank, California, with engineers embedded in the manufacturing area to address problems quickly. Procurement of the aircraft's components occurred secretly. When Johnson ordered altimeters calibrated to 80,000 feet (24,400 m) from a company whose instruments only went to 45,000 feet (13,700 m), the CIA set up a cover story involving experimental rocket aircraft. Shell Oil developed a new low-volatility, low vapor pressure jet fuel that would not evaporate at high altitudes; the fuel became known as JP-7. Manufacturing several hundred thousand gallons for the aircraft in 1955 caused a nationwide shortage of Esso's FLIT insecticide.

Realizing the plane could not be tested and flown out of Burbank Airport, they selected what would become Area 51. It was acquired and a paved runway constructed for the project. The planes were dismantled, loaded onto cargo planes, and flown to the facility for testing. The aircraft was renamed the U-2 in July 1955, the same month the first aircraft, Article 341, was delivered to Groom Lake. The "U" referred to the deliberately vague designation "utility" instead of "R" for "reconnaissance", and the U-1 and U-3 aircraft already existed. The CIA assigned the cryptonym AQUATONE to the project, with the USAF using the name OILSTONE for their support to the CIA.

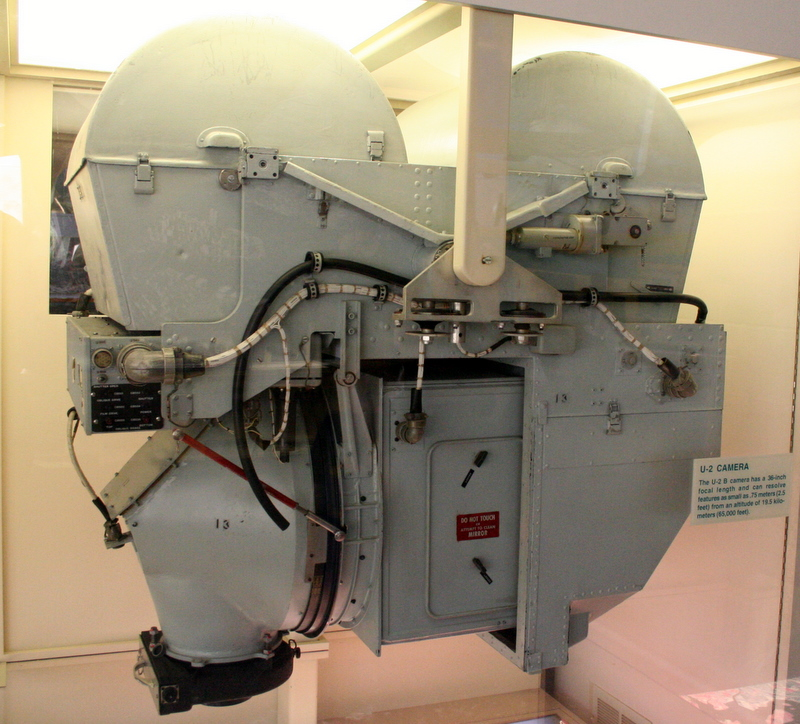
Model "B" U-2 camera on display at the National Air and Space Museum

James Baker developed the optics for a large-format camera to be used in the U-2 while working for Perkin-Elmer. The new camera had a resolution of 2.5 feet (76 cm) from an altitude of 60,000 feet (18,000 m). The aircraft was so crowded that when Baker asked Johnson for six more inches (15 cm) of space for a lens with a 240-inch (610 cm) focal length, Johnson replied "I'd sell my grandmother for six more inches!"; Baker instead used a 180-inch (460 cm) f/13.85 lens in a 13 in × 13 in (33 cm × 33 cm) format for his final design.

=== Fuel ===
The U-2 has used Jet Propellant Thermally Stable (JPTS) since the aircraft's development in the 1950s. JPTS is a high thermal stability, high altitude fuel, created specifically for the U-2. JPTS has a lower freeze point, higher viscosity, and higher thermal stability than standard USAF fuels. In 1999, the Air Force spent approximately $11.3 million (equivalent to $20.58 million in 2023 dollars) on fuel for the U-2 aircraft and was looking for a lower-cost alternative. JPTS is a specialty fuel and as such has limited worldwide availability and costs over three times the unit volume price of USAF's primary jet fuel, JP-8. Research was carried out to find a cheaper and easier alternative involving additives to generally used jet fuels. A JP-8 based alternative, JP-8+100LT, was being considered in 2001. JP-8+100 has increased thermal stability by 100 °F (56 °C) over stock JP-8, and is only 0.5 cents per gallon more expensive; low-temperature additives can be blended to this stock to achieve desired cold performance.

The small landing gear made a perfect balance in the fuel tanks essential for a safe landing. Similarly to sailplanes, the U-2 has a yaw string on the canopy to detect slip or skid during the approach. A skid during flight with no bank is the hint of an imbalance around the longitudinal axis which could be resolved by moving the fuel to the left or right wing tank.

=== Radar cross-section reduction ===
When the first overflights of the Soviet Union were tracked by radar, the CIA initiated Project Rainbow to reduce the U-2's radar cross-section. This effort ultimately proved unsuccessful, and work began on a follow-on aircraft, which resulted in the Lockheed A-12 Oxcart.

=== Possible successor ===
In August 2015, the 60th anniversary of the U-2 program, Lockheed Martin's Skunk Works revealed they were internally developing a successor to the U-2, referred to as the UQ-2 or RQ-X, combining features from both the manned U-2 and unmanned Northrop Grumman RQ-4 Global Hawk and improving upon them. Disclosed details say the design is essentially an improved U-2 airframe with the same engine, service ceiling, sensors, and cockpit, with the main differences being an optional manning capability (something Lockheed has proposed for the U-2 to the USAF several times, but has never gained traction) and low-observable characteristics. The USAF has no requirement or schedule for a next-generation High-Altitude Long Endurance (HALE) platform, but Lockheed sees a future need and wants something in development early. The company's last attempt to create a stealth unmanned aircraft was the RQ-3 DarkStar, which never made it past flight testing and was canceled. Plans for a U-2 replacement would not conflict with the development of the SR-72, another project by the company to create a hypersonic unmanned surveillance plane, as it would be suited for missions that require greater speed for time-sensitive targets.

The company released a notional artist's impression of the TR-X aircraft at an Air Force Association conference in Washington on 14 September 2015. Its name was changed to mean "tactical reconnaissance" to reflect its purpose as an affordable peace and wartime intelligence, surveillance and reconnaissance (ISR) aircraft, distinguishing it from strategic, penetrating SR-71-class platforms; TR is a reference to the short-lived rebranding of the U-2 as the TR-1 in the 1980s. Size, and thus cost, is kept down by having less endurance than the Global Hawk at around 20 hours, which is still about the same time as a normal RQ-4 sortie even though it is capable of flying for 34 hours. The TR-X concept is aimed squarely at USAF needs and is not currently being marketed to the CIA or other government agencies. It would have increased power and cooling to accommodate new sensors, communication equipment, electronic warfare suites, and perhaps offensive or defensive laser weapons. TR-X could be ready for service in the 2025 timeframe, with a fleet of 25–30 aircraft proposed to replace the nearly 40-aircraft mix of U-2s and RQ-4s.

Lockheed Martin revealed more specifications about the TR-X concept at a 15 March 2016 media day, confirming the aircraft would be unmanned and air refuelable. Its maximum takeoff weight would be greater than either the U-2's or RQ-4's at around 54,000 lb (24,000 kg), with a 5,000-pound (2,300 kg) payload and 130-foot (40 m) wingspan. It will use the same F118-101 turbofan and generator as the U-2, but thrust could increase to 19,000 pounds (8,600 kg) and power increased to 65–75 kVA; service ceiling would increase to 77,000 ft (23,000 m) with a second engine. The TR-X is meant to be "survivable, not unnoticeable", operating outside of enemy air defense bubbles rather than penetrating into them.

=== Avionics Tech Refresh ===
In 2020, the US Air Force awarded the Avionics Tech Refresh contract to Lockheed Martin for upgrading the U-2. In February 2020, the flight tests and the installation of new electro-optical reconnaissance systems were completed. SYERS-2C cameras manufactured by Collins Aerospace equip the entire U-2S fleet. The contract is valued at $50 million. The U-2S's ISR very high altitude mission requires changes for avionics suite for the U-2's onboard systems, a new mission computer designed to the U.S. Air Force's open mission systems standard and a new and modern cockpit displays (primary flight display or PFD).

The avionics upgrades are scheduled to be completed by 2022. Lockheed Martin then plans to refresh the U-2's sensors and other electronic systems, to act as a node in the Advanced Battle Management System (ABMS) now under development.

== Design ==
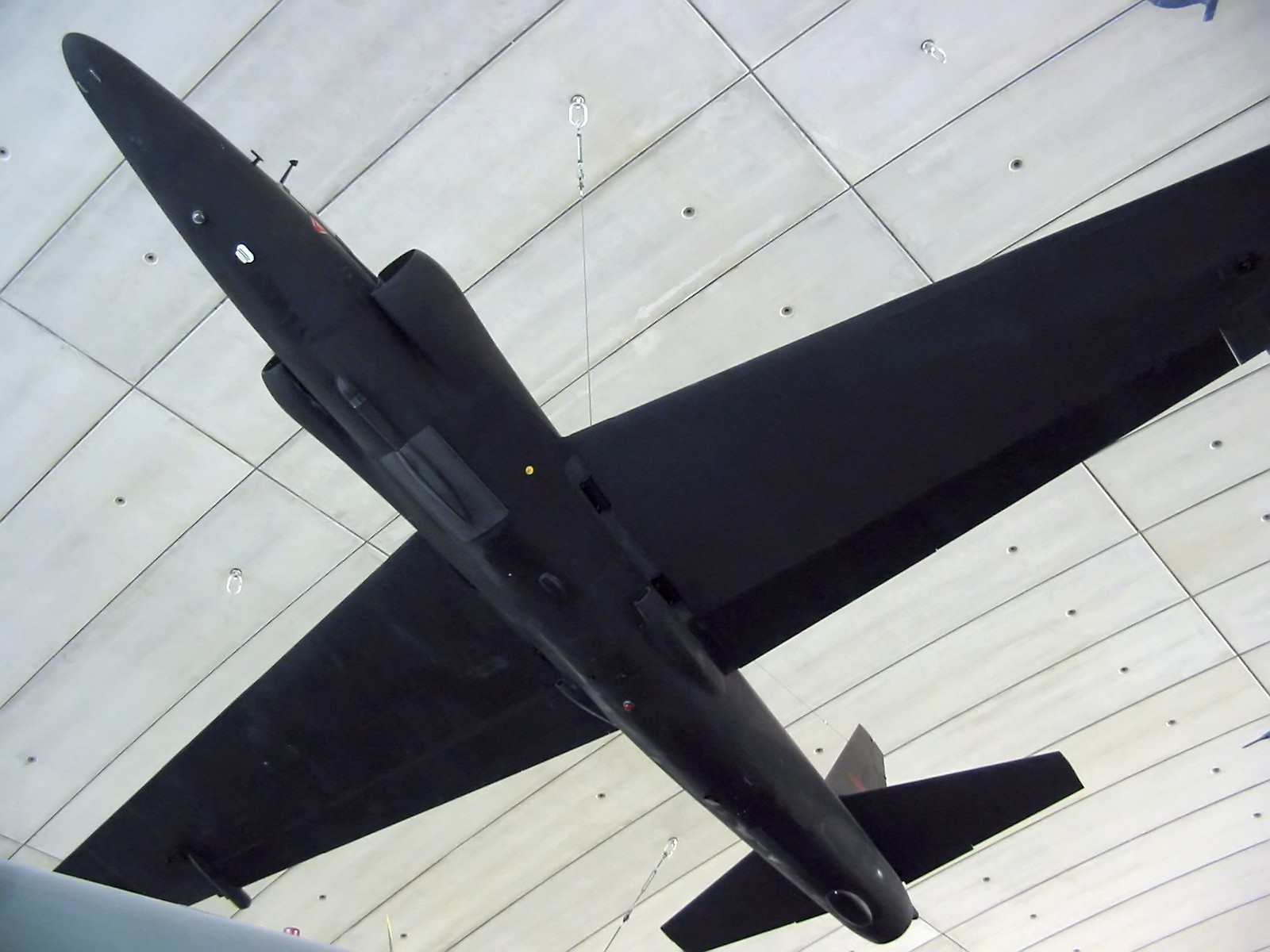
U-2 at the Imperial War Museum, Duxford

The design that gives the U-2 its remarkable performance also makes it a difficult aircraft to fly. Martin Knutson said that it "was the highest workload air plane I believe ever designed and built … you're wrestling with the airplane and operating the camera systems at all times", leaving no time to "worry about whether you're over Russia or you're flying over Southern California". The U-2 was designed and manufactured for minimum airframe weight, which results in an aircraft with little margin for error. Most aircraft were single-seat versions, with only five two-seat trainer versions known to exist. Early U-2 variants were powered by Pratt & Whitney J57 turbojet engines. The U-2C and TR-1A variants used the more powerful Pratt & Whitney J75 turbojet. The U-2S and TU-2S variants incorporated the more powerful General Electric F118 turbofan engine.

High aspect ratio wings give the U-2 glider-like characteristics, with an engine out glide ratio of about 23:1, comparable to gliders of the time. To maintain their operational ceiling of 70,000 feet (21,000 m), the early U-2A and U-2C models had to fly very near their never-exceed speed (V_{NE}). The margin between that maximum speed and the stall speed at that altitude was only 10 knots (12 mph; 19 km/h). This narrow window is called the "coffin corner", because breaching either limit was likely to cause airflow separation at the wings or tail. For most of the time on a typical mission the U-2 was flying less than five knots (6 mph; 9 km/h) above stall speed. A stall would cause a loss of altitude, possibly leading to detection and overstress of the airframe.

The U-2's flight controls are designed for high-altitude flight; the controls require light control inputs at operational altitude. However, at lower altitudes the higher air density and lack of a power-assisted control system make the aircraft very difficult to fly: control inputs must be extreme to achieve the desired response, and a great deal of physical strength is needed to operate the controls. The U-2 is very sensitive to crosswinds, which, together with its tendency to float over the runway, makes the aircraft notoriously difficult to land. As it approaches the runway, the cushion of air provided by the high-lift wings in ground effect is so pronounced that the U-2 will not land unless the wings are fully stalled. A landing U-2 is accompanied on the ground by a chase car, which is driven by a second U-2 pilot who assists the landing U-2 by reporting the aircraft's altitude. In practice, once the aircraft has descended to an altitude of two feet (0.61 m) above the runway the pilot initiates a stall and the aircraft falls from this height. Chase cars and live calling of aircraft altitude are necessary because the landing gear is not designed to absorb the weight of the aircraft when falling from altitudes much above two feet (0.61 m).

Instead of the typical tricycle landing gear, the U-2 uses a bicycle configuration with a forward set of main wheels located just behind the cockpit and a rear set of main wheels located behind the engine. The rear wheels are coupled to the rudder to provide steering during taxiing. To maintain balance while taxiing and take-off, two auxiliary wheels called "pogos" are attached under the wings. These fit into sockets underneath each wing at about mid-span and fall off at takeoff. To protect the wings during landing, each wingtip has a titanium skid. After the U-2 comes to a halt, the ground crew re-installs the pogos, then the aircraft taxis to parking.

Because of the high operating altitude and the cockpit's partial pressurization, equivalent to 28,000 feet (8,500 m) pressure altitude, the pilot wears a pressurized space suit called the S1034, which delivers the pilot's oxygen supply and provides emergency protection in case cabin pressure is lost. While pilots can drink water and eat various liquid foods in squeezable containers through a self-sealing hole in the face mask, they typically lose up to 5% of their body mass on an eight-hour mission.

The first model of the pressure suit, used by Lockheed test pilots, made no provision for urination. A subsequent model required the pilot to be catheterized before donning his flying suit. This method of permitting urination during flight proved very uncomfortable and, by the autumn of 1955, was replaced with an external bladder arrangement that made the catheter unnecessary. To reduce elimination, pilots ate a low-bulk, high-protein diet on the day before and the morning of each mission.

Initially, pilots had the option of carrying a suicide pill, although most chose not to. If put in the mouth and bitten, the "L-pill"—containing liquid potassium cyanide—would cause death in 10–15 seconds. After a pilot almost accidentally ingested an L-pill instead of candy during a December 1956 flight, the suicide pills were put into boxes to avoid confusion. When in 1960 the CIA realized that a pill breaking inside the cockpit would kill the pilot, it destroyed the L-pills, and as a replacement, its Technical Services Division developed a needle poisoned with a powerful shellfish toxin and hidden in a silver dollar. Only one was made because the agency decided if any pilot needed to use it the program would probably be canceled. Like the suicide pill, not all pilots carried the coin, and Knutson did not know of any that intended to commit suicide; he carried it as a weapon to escape in the event of capture.

To decrease the risk of developing decompression sickness, pilots breathe 100% oxygen for an hour prior to taking off to remove nitrogen from the blood. A portable oxygen supply is used during transport to the aircraft. Since 2001, more than a dozen pilots have reportedly suffered the effects of decompression sickness, including permanent brain damage in nine cases; initial symptoms include disorientation and becoming unable to read. Factors increasing the risk of illness since 2001 include longer mission durations and more cockpit activity. Conventional reconnaissance missions would limit pilot duties to maintaining flight paths for camera photography. Operations over Afghanistan included more real-time activities, such as communication with ground troops, increasing their bodies' oxygen requirements and the risk of nitrogen bubble formation. U-2 pilots now exercise during oxygen pre-breathing. In 2012, modifications were initiated under the Cockpit Altitude Reduction Effort (CARE), increasing the cabin pressure from 3.88 psi to 7.65 psi, a 15,000-foot (4,600 m) altitude equivalent. The urine collection device also was rebuilt to eliminate leakage.

=== Sensors ===
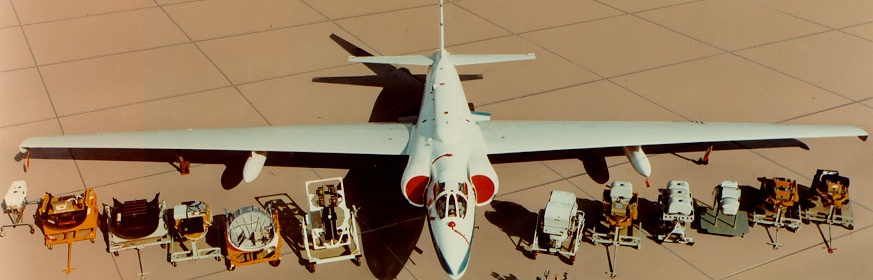
U-2 with range of possible payloads, 2009

Existing cameras had ground resolution down to 23 feet (7 m) from an altitude of 33,000 feet (10,000 m), and were inadequate for the 70,000 feet (21,000 m) altitude. Ground resolution of 9.8 feet (3 m) was required, at a maximum payload weight of 440 pounds (200 kg). The U-2's camera was specially designed by James G. Baker of Harvard and Richard Scott Perkin of the Perkin-Elmer Company, initially in collaboration and later separately.

Initial missions were flown with the trimetrogon "A" camera, consisting of three 24-inch-focal-length (610 mm) cameras, with F/8 resolving 60 lines per mm, and the ground resolution can be inferred by calculation to be 24 inches (60 cm). This was followed by the "B" camera with a 36-inch-focal-length (910 mm) lens with F/10 and image motion compensation, resolving 100 lines per mm, and the ground resolution can be inferred by calculation to be 9.1 inches (23 cm). It was a panoramic camera which took pictures of an extremely large area of the earth's surface. The lens design consisted of a single aspheric singlet lens. Six-thousand-foot (1,800 m) reels of film were used, with the emulsion being coated on a polyester (PET) base that offered significantly improved dimensional stability over extremes of temperature and humidity compared to conventional cellulose acetate.

In addition, the U-2 also carried a low-resolution Perkin-Elmer tracking camera using a 3-inch (7.6 cm) lens, which made continuous horizon-to-horizon photographs. This is common practice in high resolution cameras in later systems also, where the large image helps localize the small high-resolution images.

The aircraft carries a variety of sensors in the nose, Q-bay (behind the cockpit, also known as the camera bay), and wing pods. The U-2 is capable of simultaneously collecting signals, imagery intelligence and air samples. Imagery intelligence sensors include either wet film photography, electro-optic, or radar imagery—the latter from the Raytheon ASARS-2 system. It can use both line-of-sight and over-horizon data links.

== Operational history ==
=== United States ===
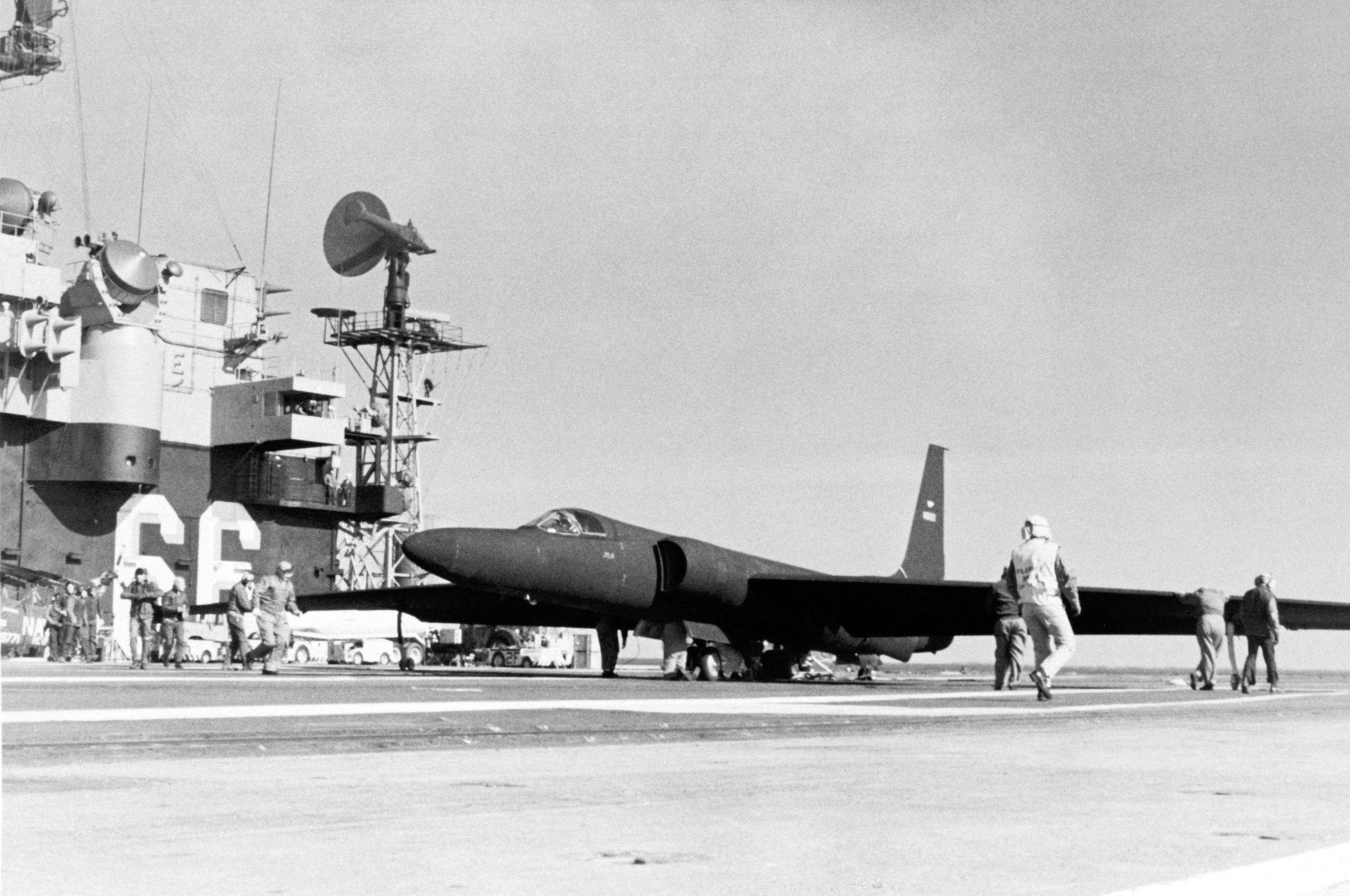
U-2 testing aboard USS America (CV-66), 1984

==== Eisenhower's Preliminary 'Open Skies' Proposal ====
Eisenhower’s desire to avoid secret reconnaissance missions over the Soviet Union, with all their risks, led him to make his famous “Open Skies” proposal in the summer of 1955, when the U-2 was still under development but making good progress. At the Geneva summit conference on 21 July 1955, President Eisenhower offered to provide airfields and other facilities in the United States for the Soviet Union to conduct aerial photography of all US military installations if the Soviet Union would provide the United States with similar facilities in Russia. Not surprisingly, Soviet leader Nikita Khrushchev almost immediately rejected Eisenhower’s offer. Although the President had hoped the Soviet Union would accept his proposal, he was prepared for rejection. While Open Skies was still being considered, Eisenhower had stated, “I’ll give it one shot. Then if they don’t accept it, we’ll fly the U-2.”

Although Eisenhower had approved every stage of the U-2’s development, the actual decision to authorize such flights was reportedly very difficult for him. He remained concerned that overflights could poison relations with the Soviet Union and might lead to hostilities. One argument that helped overcome the President’s reluctance was the CIA’s longstanding contention that U-2 flights might actually go undetected because Soviet radars would not be able to track aircraft at such high altitudes. This belief was based on a 1952 study of Soviet World War II–vintage radars and on 1955 tests using US radars, which—unknown to US officials—were not as effective as Soviet radars against high-altitude targets. Shortly before U-2 operations began, however, the CIA’s Office of Scientific Intelligence (OSI) conducted a vulnerability study of the U-2 that was published on 28 May 1956. The study’s conclusion was that “Maximum Soviet radar detection ranges against the Project aircraft at elevation in excess of 55,000 feet would vary from 20 to 150 miles. . . . In our opinion, detection can therefore be assumed.” The OSI study added, however, “it is doubtful that the Soviets can achieve consistent tracking of the Project vehicle.” This study seems to have had little impact on the thinking of the top project officials. They continued to believe that the Soviets would not be able to track the U-2 and might even fail to detect it, except for possible vague indications. This proved to be highly inaccurate, as demonstrated by the Soviet Air Defence Forces in Sverdlovsk, Russia, on 1 May 1960 [1960 U-2 incident].

==== Pilot selection and training ====
Though the USAF and the Navy would eventually fly the U-2, the CIA had majority control over the project, code-named Project DRAGON LADY. Despite SAC chief LeMay's early dismissal of the CL-282, the USAF in 1955 sought to take over the project and put it under SAC until Eisenhower repeated his opposition to military personnel flying the aircraft. Nonetheless, the USAF substantially participated in the project; Bissell described it as a "49 percent" partner. The USAF agreed to select and train pilots and plot missions, while the CIA would handle cameras and project security, process film, and arrange foreign bases.

Beyond not using American military personnel to fly the U-2, Eisenhower preferred to use non-U.S. citizens. Seven Greek pilots and a Polish expatriate were added to the U-2 trainees although only two of the Greek pilots were subsequently allowed to fly the aircraft. Their flight proficiency was poor. The language barrier and a lack of appropriate flying experience proved problematic; by late 1955, foreign pilots had been dropped from the program. USAF pilots had to resign their military commissions before joining the agency as civilians, a process referred to as "sheep dipping", and were always called "drivers", not pilots. The program only recruited fighter pilots with reserve USAF commissions, as regular commissions complicated the resignation process. The program offered high salaries and the USAF promised that pilots could return at the same rank as their peers. The CIA's standards for selection were higher than the USAF's once the latter began its own U-2 flights; although more candidates were rejected, the CIA's program had a much lower accident rate. Test pilot Tony LeVier trained other Lockheed pilots to fly the U-2. By September 1955 he had trained six USAF pilots, who in turn trained other "sheep-dipped" pilots. As no two-seat trainer model was available for the program's first 15 years, training was done before the trainee's first solo flight and via radio. Pilots had to adjust to the U-2's unusual combination of jet engines and enormous, high-lift glider wings; because of the "coffin corner" they learned of the need to pay complete attention to flying when not using the autopilot.

==== Test flights ====
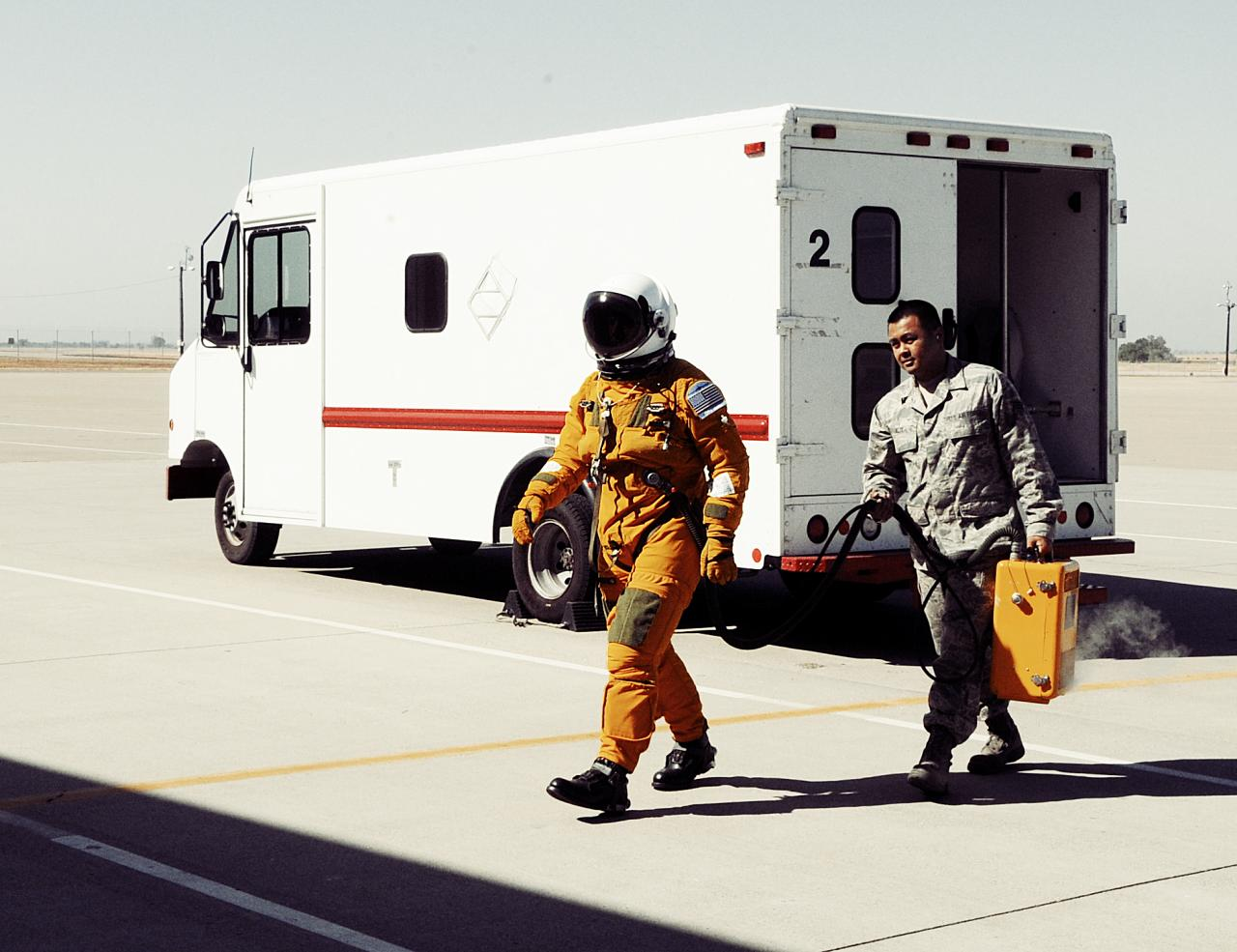
Pilot in Model S1034 Pilots Protective Assembly for U-2 Reconnaissance Aircraft, 2010

After AQUATONE was funded and security handled by the CIA, the agency referred to all its high altitude aircraft as "articles". This was intended to reduce the chances of a security breach as part of a compartmented security system. These three-digit "article" numbers were factory assigned. Article 341 was the original U-2 prototype, and it never received a USAF serial. The first flight took place at Groom Lake on 1 August 1955, during what was intended to be only a high-speed taxi test. The sailplane-like wings were so efficient that the aircraft jumped into the air at 70 knots (81 mph; 130 km/h), amazing LeVier who, as he later said, "had no intentions whatsoever of flying". The lake bed had no markings, making it difficult for LeVier to judge the distance to the ground, and the brakes proved too weak; he bounced the U-2 once before it stopped rolling, but the aircraft suffered only minor damage. LeVier again found landing the U-2 difficult during the first intentional test flight three days later. On his sixth try, he found that landing the aircraft by touching down on the rear wheel first was better than making the initial touchdown with the front wheel. Pilots continued to have difficulty during landing because the ground effect held the aircraft off the runway for long distances. On a test flight on 8 August, the U-2 reached 32,000 feet (9,800 m), proving that Johnson had met his promised specifications and deadline. By 16 August, the prototype flew at 52,000 feet (15,800 m), an altitude never before reached in sustained flight; by 8 September, it reached 65,000 feet (19,800 m).

By January 1956, the U-2 had so impressed the USAF that it decided to obtain its own aircraft. The USAF purchased a total of 31 U-2s through the CIA; the transaction's code name, Project DRAGON LADY, was the origin of the aircraft's nickname. Meanwhile, U-2s conducted eight overflights of the U.S. in April 1956, convincing project overseers that the aircraft was ready for deployment. As often happens with new aircraft designs, there were several operational accidents. One occurred during these test flights when a U-2 suffered a flameout over Tennessee; the pilot calculated that he could reach New Mexico. Every air base in the continental U.S. had sealed orders to carry out if a U-2 landed. The commander of Kirtland Air Force Base near Albuquerque, New Mexico, was told to open his orders, prepare for the arrival of an unusual aircraft making a deadstick landing, and get it inside a hangar as soon as possible. The U-2 successfully landed after gliding for more than 300 miles (480 km), and its strange, glider-like appearance and the space-suited pilot startled the base commander and other witnesses.

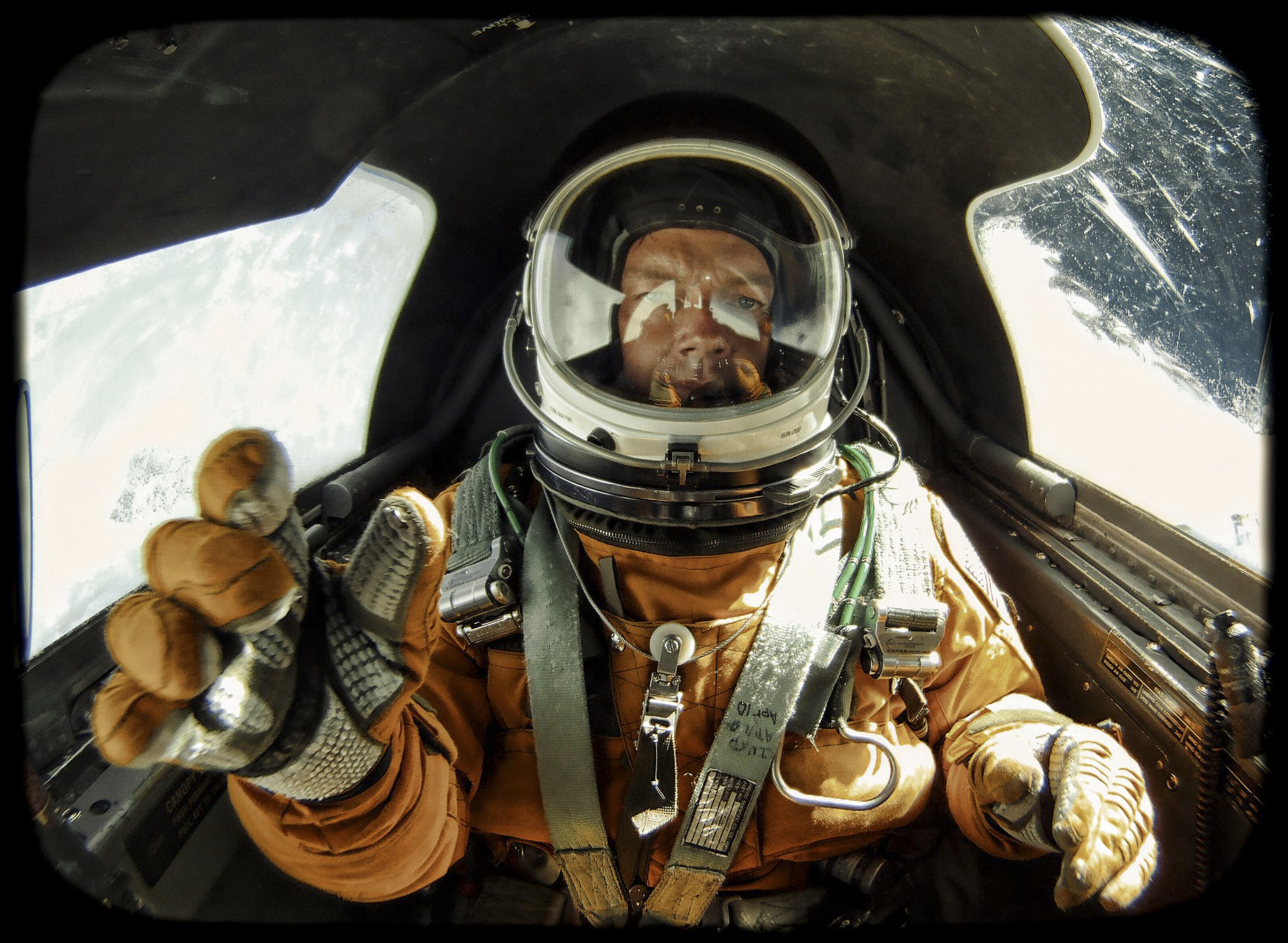
A pilot in a U-2 cockpit in 2010 at 70,000 ft wearing a pressure suit similar to that used in the Lockheed SR-71.

Not all U-2 incidents were so benign, with three fatal accidents in 1956 alone. The first was on 15 May 1956, when the pilot stalled the aircraft during a post-takeoff maneuver that was intended to drop off the wingtip outrigger wheels. The second occurred on 31 August, when the pilot stalled the aircraft immediately after takeoff. On 17 September, a third aircraft disintegrated during ascent in Germany, also killing the pilot. There were other non-fatal incidents, including at least one that resulted in the loss of the aircraft.

==== Cover story ====
A committee of Army, Navy, USAF, CIA, NSA, and State Department representatives created lists of priority targets for U-2 and other intelligence-gathering methods. The U-2 project received the list and drew up flight plans, and the committee provided a detailed rationale for each plan for the president to consider as he decided whether to approve it. The CIA's Photo Intelligence Division grew in size to prepare for the expected flood of U-2 photographs. Before the aircraft became operational, however, USAF's Project Genetrix, which used high-altitude balloons to photograph the Soviet Union, China, and eastern Europe, led to many diplomatic protests from those countries and for a while, CIA officials feared that the U-2 project was at risk. While Genetrix was also a technical failure—only 34 of the 516 balloons returned usable photographs—the balloon flights gave the United States many clues on how the Communist countries used radar to track overflights, which benefited the U-2 program.

With approval from the National Advisory Committee for Aeronautics (NACA)'s director Hugh Dryden, Bissell's team at the CIA developed a cover story for the U-2 that described the aircraft as used by NACA for high-altitude weather research; the cover story would be used if the aircraft were lost over hostile territory. U-2s flew some real weather-related missions, taking photographs that appeared in the press, and sometimes had civilian government decals, but few believed in the cover story; in May 1957 the UK's Daily Express newspaper reported the U-2 operating east of the Iron Curtain.

The civilian advisers Land and Killian disagreed with the cover story, advising that in case of an aircraft loss, the United States forthrightly acknowledge its use of U-2 overflights "to guard against surprise attack". Their advice was not followed, and the weather cover story led to the disaster that followed the May 1960 U-2 loss.

High-altitude testing of the U-2 also led to the unexpected side effect of a huge increase in reports of unidentified flying objects (UFOs). In the mid-1950s, most commercial airliners flew at altitudes between 10,000 and 20,000 feet and military aircraft like the B-47s and B-57s operated at altitudes below 40,000 feet. Consequently, once U-2s started flying at altitudes above 60,000 feet, air-traffic controllers began receiving increasing numbers of UFO reports. Such reports were most prevalent in the early evening hours from pilots of airliners flying from east to west. When the sun dropped below the horizon of an airliner flying at 20,000 feet, the plane was in darkness. But, if a U-2 was airborne in the vicinity of the airliner at the same time, its horizon from an altitude of 60,000 feet was considerably more distant, and, being so high in the sky, its silver wings would catch and reflect the rays of the sun and appear to the airliner pilot, 40,000 feet below, to be fiery objects. Even during daylight hours, the silver bodies of the high-flying U-2s could catch the sun and cause reflections or glints that could be seen at lower altitudes and even on the ground. At this time, no one believed manned flight was possible above 60,000 feet, so no one expected to see an object so high in the sky. U-2 and later OXCART flights accounted for more than one-half of all UFO reports during the late 1950s and most of the 1960s.

==== Initial overflights of International territory ====
The British government in January 1956 approved the U-2's deployment from RAF Lakenheath. NACA announced that the USAF Air Weather Service would use a Lockheed-developed aircraft to study the weather and cosmic rays at altitudes up to 55,000 feet; accordingly, the first CIA detachment of U-2s ("Detachment A") was known publicly as the 1st Weather Reconnaissance Squadron, Provisional (WRSP-1). The death in April 1956, however, of British agent Lionel Crabb while examining Soviet ships in Portsmouth harbor embarrassed the British government, which asked the United States to postpone the Lakenheath flights. To avoid delays, in June 1956, Detachment A moved to Wiesbaden, Germany, without approval from the German government, while Giebelstadt Army Airfield was prepared as a more permanent base.

Eisenhower remained concerned that despite their great intelligence value, overflights of the Soviet Union might cause a war. While the U-2 was under development, at the 1955 Geneva Summit he proposed to Nikita Khrushchev that the Soviet Union and the United States would each grant the other country airfields to use to photograph military installations. Khrushchev rejected the "Open Skies" proposal.

The CIA told the president that the Soviets could not track high-altitude U-2 flights; this belief was based on studies using old Soviet radar systems and American systems that were not as effective at high altitudes as current Soviet systems, of which the U.S. was not aware. Knutson later said that "the U-2 was really quite invisible to American radar, but Russian radar were a little different—better, you might say". Although the Office of Scientific Intelligence issued a more cautious report in May 1956 that stated that detection was possible, it believed that the Soviets could not consistently track the aircraft. Dulles further told Eisenhower, according to presidential aide Andrew Goodpaster, that in any aircraft loss the pilot would almost certainly not survive. With such assurances and the growing demand for accurate intelligence regarding the alleged "bomber gap" between the U.S. and the Soviet Union, in June 1956 Eisenhower approved 10 days of overflights.

The first U-2 overflight had already occurred, using the existing authorization of air force overflights over Eastern Europe. On 20 June 1956, a U-2 flew over Poland and East Germany, with more flights on 2 July. When Eisenhower refused to approve the U-2's flight over Soviet airspace, the CIA turned to a foreign power, MI6, the British Secret Intelligence Service, to request authorization from Prime Minister of the United Kingdom Harold Macmillan, who approved the flights. The fact that radar had—contrary to the CIA's expectations—successfully tracked the aircraft worried Eisenhower, but he approved the first Soviet overflight, Mission 2013 on 4 July. U-2 Article 347's main targets were the Soviet submarine construction program in Leningrad, and counting the numbers of the new Myasishchev M-4 "Bison" bomber.

Soviet radar monitored the U-2 incursion into Soviet airspace in real-time, with radar tracking starting from the time the aircraft crossed into East German airspace. Soviet leader Nikita Khrushchev was informed immediately. While contemplating appropriate retaliatory steps, he ordered Soviet Ambassador to Washington, Georgy Zarubin, to protest vehemently to the U.S. State Department that very day, explaining that the recent trust-building to ease tensions between the two countries was undermined by the overflight provocations.

A second flight on 5 July continued searching for Bisons, took photographs of Moscow (the only ones taken by the program), and flew over cloud-covered rocket factories at Kaliningrad and Khimki. Eisenhower knew from the earlier overflights that his hope of no Soviet detection was unrealistic, but ordered that the overflights stop if the aircraft could be tracked. The CIA found that the Soviets could not consistently track the U-2s and therefore did not know that Moscow and Leningrad had been overflown. The aircraft's photographs showed tiny images of MiG-15s and MiG-17s attempting and failing to intercept the aircraft, proving that the Soviets could not shoot down an operational U-2. Knutson recalled that the "constant stream of Russian fighters" trying to shoot down the U-2 during overflights was sometimes "so thick" that they interfered with photographs. Repeatedly failing for years to stop the aircraft embarrassed the USSR, which made diplomatic protests against the flights but did not publicize the penetration of Soviet territory.

U-2 missions from Wiesbaden would depart westward in order to gain altitude over friendly territory before turning eastward at operational altitudes. The NATO Air Defence mission in that area included No. 1 Air Division RCAF (Europe), which operated the Canadair Sabre Mark 6 from bases in northeastern France. This aircraft had a service ceiling of 54,000 feet and numerous encounters between the U-2 and RCAF 'ZULU' alert flights have been recorded for posterity.

Overflights over Soviet territory produced generally good intelligence, despite occasional problems caused by cloud cover. The huge amount of film taken by these missions provided significant information about the Soviet Union’s ability to track and intercept U-2s. Photointerpreters examining the films eventually discovered the tiny images of MiG-15s and MiG-17s beneath the U-2s in various pursuit and attack attitudes: climbing, flipping over, and falling toward Earth. It was even possible to determine their approximate altitudes. These photographs showed that the Soviet air defense system was able to track U-2s well enough to attempt interception, but they also provided proof that the fighter aircraft available to the Soviet Union in 1956 could not bring down a U-2 at operational altitude.

==== "Bomber gap" disproven ====
On 10 July, the Soviets protested what they described as overflights by a USAF "twin-engine medium bomber", apparently believing that it was a B-57 Canberra. The U.S. replied on 19 July that no American "military planes" had overflown the Soviet Union, but the fact that the Soviets' report showed that they could track the U-2s for extended periods caused Eisenhower to immediately halt overflights over eastern Europe. Beyond the Soviet protests, the president was concerned about the American public's reaction to the news that the U.S. had violated international law. To avoid project cancellation, the CIA began Project Rainbow to make the U-2 less detectable. The eight overflights over communist territory, however, had already shown that the bomber gap did not exist; the U-2s had not found any Myasishchev M-4 Bison bombers at the nine bases they had visited. Because the Eisenhower administration could not disclose the source of its intelligence, however, Congressional and public debate over the bomber gap continued.

==== Suez Crisis and aftermath ====
The presidential order did not restrict U-2 flights outside eastern Europe. In May 1956, Turkey approved the deployment of Detachment B at Incirlik Air Base, near Adana, Turkey. Before the new detachment was ready, however, Detachment A in late August used Adana as a refueling base to photograph the Mediterranean. The aircraft found evidence of many British troops on Malta and Cyprus as the United Kingdom prepared for its forthcoming intervention in Suez. The U.S. released some of the photographs to the British government. As the crisis grew in seriousness, the project converted from a source of strategic reconnaissance, which prioritized high quality over speed (the film was processed by its maker, then analyzed in Washington), to a tactical reconnaissance unit that provided immediate analysis. The Photo Intelligence Division set up a lab at Wiesbaden; as Detachment B took over from A and flew over targets that remain classified as of July 2013, the Wiesbaden lab's rapid reports helped the U.S. government to predict the Israeli-British-French attack on Egypt three days before it began on 29 October. On 1 November a flight flew over the Egyptian air base at Almaza twice, 10 minutes apart; in between the British and French attacked the base, and the visible results of the attack in the "10-minute reconnaissance" impressed Eisenhower. Beginning on 5 November, flights over Syria showed that the Soviets had not sent aircraft there despite their threats against the British, French and Israelis, a cause of worry for the U.S.

In the four years following the Suez Crisis, repeated U-2 missions over the Middle East were launched, particularly in times of tension. The end of the 1958 Lebanon crisis saw a decline in U-2 operations, although Detachment B U-2s operating from Turkey still sometimes overflew the Middle East along with occasional missions over Albania to check for Soviet missile activity. Israel was a major target of U-2 missions during this period, with U-2 missions detecting the construction of the Negev Nuclear Research Center in 1958, first bringing Israel's nuclear program to the attention of the US. The overflights drew the attention of the Israeli Air Force. Its radars detected and tracked the overflights, and on numerous occasions, Israeli fighter aircraft were scrambled to intercept them but were unable to reach their altitude. The Israeli government was baffled by the overflights. However, Israeli fighter pilots were twice able to spot the intruding aircraft. On 11 March 1959, two Israeli Super Mystère fighters were directed to intercept a U-2 detected over Israel by Israeli ground-based radar. Although the aircraft were unable to make an intercept, the formation leader, Major Yosef Alon, managed to get a good look at the aircraft. He subsequently identified it out of a book as a U-2, registered as a weather reconnaissance aircraft to the US Weather Service. On 22 July 1959, after an overflight was detected, an Israeli Air Force Vautour jet was deployed to photograph the mysterious aircraft. The Vautour came within visual range and the U-2 was successfully photographed. In spite of this, it was not until the 1960 shootdown of a U-2 over the Soviet Union and its subsequent public exposure as a spy plane that the Israeli government understood the identity of the mystery aircraft.

==== Renewal of Eastern Bloc overflights ====
Eisenhower refused CIA pleas in September 1956 to reauthorize overflights of Eastern Europe but the Hungarian Revolution in November, and his reelection that month, caused the president to permit flights over border areas. Soviet interceptors could still not reach the U-2s but, after the Soviets protested a December overflight of Vladivostok by RB-57Ds, Eisenhower again forbade communist overflights. Flights close to the border continued, now including the first ELINT-equipped U-2s. In May 1957, Eisenhower again authorized overflights over certain important Soviet missile and atomic facilities. He continued to personally authorize each flight, closely examining maps and sometimes making changes to the flight plan. By 1957, one of the European units was based at Giebelstadt, and the far eastern unit was based at the Naval Air Facility Atsugi, Japan.

Part of the reason for the May reauthorization was that the CIA promised that improvements from Project RAINBOW would make the majority of U-2 flights undetected. On 2 April 1957, a RAINBOW test flight crashed in Nevada, killing the pilot. The U-2's large wingspan slowed its descent during crashes, often leaving its remains salvageable; Lockheed was able to rebuild the wreckage from the incident into a flyable airframe, but that it could do so should have been evidence to the CIA that its cover story might not be viable after a crash in hostile territory. The RAINBOW anti-radar modifications were not very successful, and their use ended in 1958.

Soviet overflights resumed in June 1957 from Eielson Air Force Base in Alaska to the Russian Far East, which had less effective radar systems. Others originated from Lahore, Pakistan. A Lahore flight on 5 August provided the first photographs of the Baikonur Cosmodrome near Tyuratam: the CIA had been unaware of its existence until then. Other flights examined the Semipalatinsk nuclear test site and the Saryshagan missile test site. After a few more overflights that year, only five more took place before the May 1960 incident because of Eisenhower's increasing caution. The president sought to avoid angering the Soviets as he worked to achieve a nuclear test ban; meanwhile, the Soviets began trying to shoot down U-2 flights that never entered Soviet airspace, and the details in their diplomatic protests showed that Soviet radar operators were able to effectively track the aircraft. To reduce visibility Lockheed painted the aircraft in a blue-black color that helped them blend in against the darkness of space, and the CIA aircraft received the more powerful Pratt & Whitney J75-P-13 engine that increased maximum altitude by 2,500 feet (800 m), to 74,600 feet (22,700 m). In April 1958, CIA source Pyotr Semyonovich Popov told his handler George Kisevalter that a senior KGB official had boasted of having "full technical details" of the U-2, leading Bissell to conclude the project had a leak. The source of the leak was never identified, although there was speculation that it was Lee Harvey Oswald, then a radar operator at a U-2 base in Japan.

The Soviets developed their own overflight aircraft, variants of the Yak-25, which in addition to photographing various parts of the world through the early 1960s acted as a target for the new MiG-19 and MiG-21 interceptors to practice for the U-2.

==== The "missile gap" ====
The successful launch of Sputnik 1 on 4 October 1957 gave credence to Soviet claims about the progress of its intercontinental ballistic missile program, and began the Sputnik crisis in the United States. The U-2 intelligence caused Eisenhower to state in a press conference on 9 October that the launch did "not raise my apprehensions, not one iota", but he refused to disclose the U-2's existence as he believed that the Soviets would demand the end of the flights. In December 1958 Khrushchev boasted that a Soviet missile could deliver a 5-megaton warhead 8,000 miles (13,000 km). Although the Soviets' SS-6 Sapwood missile program was actually stalled by technical failures, subsequent boasts—and U.S. secretary of defense Neil McElroy's statement in February 1959 to Congress that the Soviets might have a three-to-one temporary advantage in ICBMs during the early 1960s—caused widespread concern in the U.S. about the existence of a "missile gap". The American intelligence community was divided, with the CIA suspecting technical delays but the USAF believing that the SS-6 was ready for deployment. Khrushchev continued to exaggerate the Soviet program's success; the missile gap concerns, and CIA and State Department support, caused Eisenhower to reauthorize one Communist territory overflight in July 1959 after 16 months, as well as many ELINT flights along the Soviet border. British U-2 overflights were made in December and February 1960. The first one targeted a large segment of the railways in the Tyuratam test range area as ballistic missiles were expected to be deployed close to rail lines, as well as nuclear complexes and missile test sites. No sites were found. Neither flight proved or disproved the existence of a "missile gap". The British flights' success contributed to Eisenhower's authorization of one overflight in April.

By 1960 U-2 pilots were aware, Knutson recalled, that Soviet surface-to-air missiles (SAMs) had improved and that overflights had become much riskier, but did not worry because "dumb fighter pilots always think it's the other guy that's going to get hit". By this time the CIA had also concluded internally that Soviet SAMs had "a high probability of successful intercept at 70,000 feet (21,300 m) providing that detection is made in sufficient time to alert the site". Despite the much-increased risk, the CIA did not stop the overflights as they were overconfident following the years of successful missions, and because of the strong demand for more missile-site photographs, the U-2 was the major source of covert intelligence on the Soviet Union and had photographed about 15% of the country, producing almost 5,500 intelligence reports. The April flight was indeed tracked quickly, and Khrushchev said in his memoir that it should have been shot down by new SAMs, but the missile crews were slow to react.

==== May 1960: U-2 shot down ====
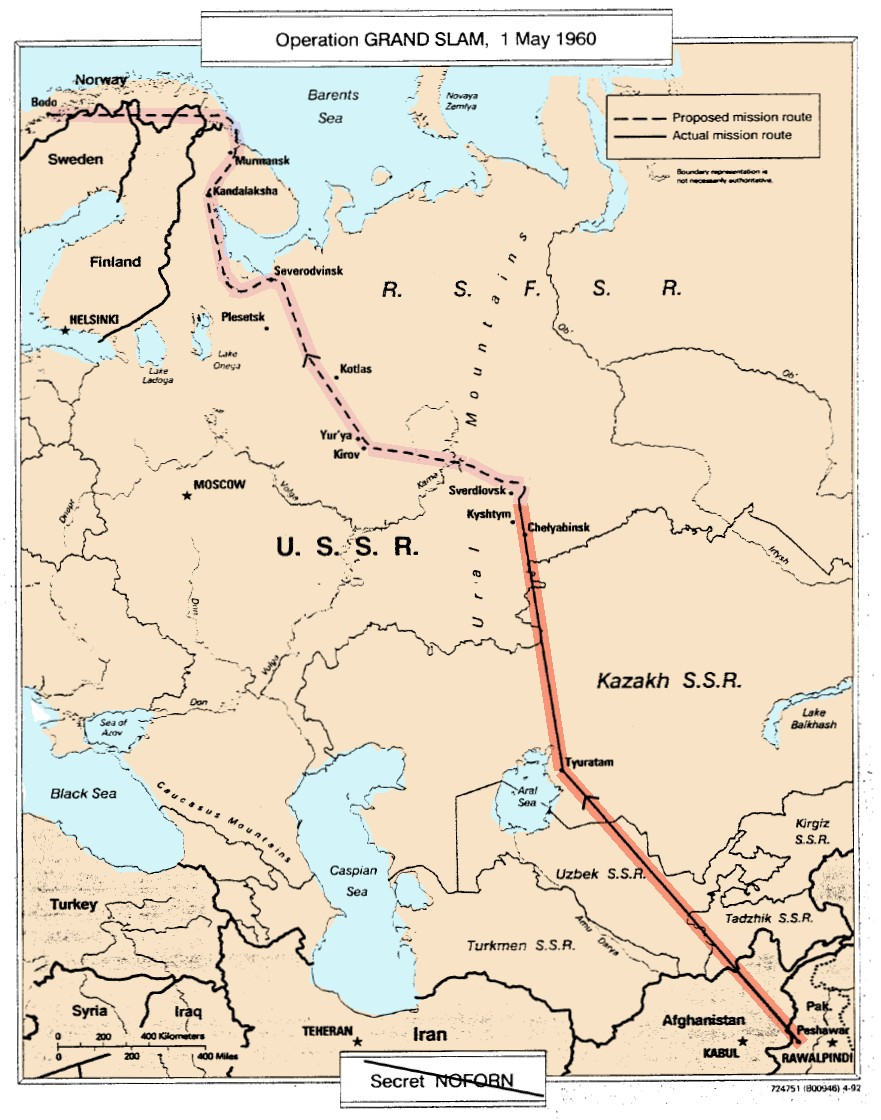
U-2 "GRAND SLAM" flight plan on 1 May 1960, from CIA publication 'The Central Intelligence Agency and Overhead Reconnaissance; The U-2 And Oxcart Programs, 1954–1974', declassified 25 June 2013.

Eisenhower authorized one more overflight, which was to be made no later than 1 May because the important Paris Summit of the Big Four Conference would begin on 16 May. The CIA chose for the mission—the 24th deep-penetration Soviet overflight—Operation GRAND SLAM, an ambitious flight plan for the first crossing of the Soviet Union from Peshawar, Pakistan to Bodø, Norway; previous flights had always exited in the direction from which they had entered. The route would permit visits to Tyuratam, Sverdlovsk, Kirov, Kotlas, Severodvinsk, and Murmansk. It was expected, given good weather, to resolve missile, nuclear and nuclear submarine intelligence issues with one flight. Francis Gary Powers, the most experienced pilot with 27 missions, was chosen for the flight. After delays, the flight began on May Day, 1 May. This was a mistake because, as an important Soviet holiday, there was much less air traffic than usual. The Soviets began tracking the U-2 15 miles (24 km) outside the border, and over Sverdlovsk, four and a half hours into the flight, one of three SA-2 (S-75 Dvina) missiles detonated behind the aircraft at 70,500 feet (21,500 m), near enough to cause it to crash; another hit a Soviet interceptor attempting to reach the American aircraft. Powers survived the near miss and was quickly captured; the crash did not destroy the U-2 and the Soviets were able to identify much of the equipment.

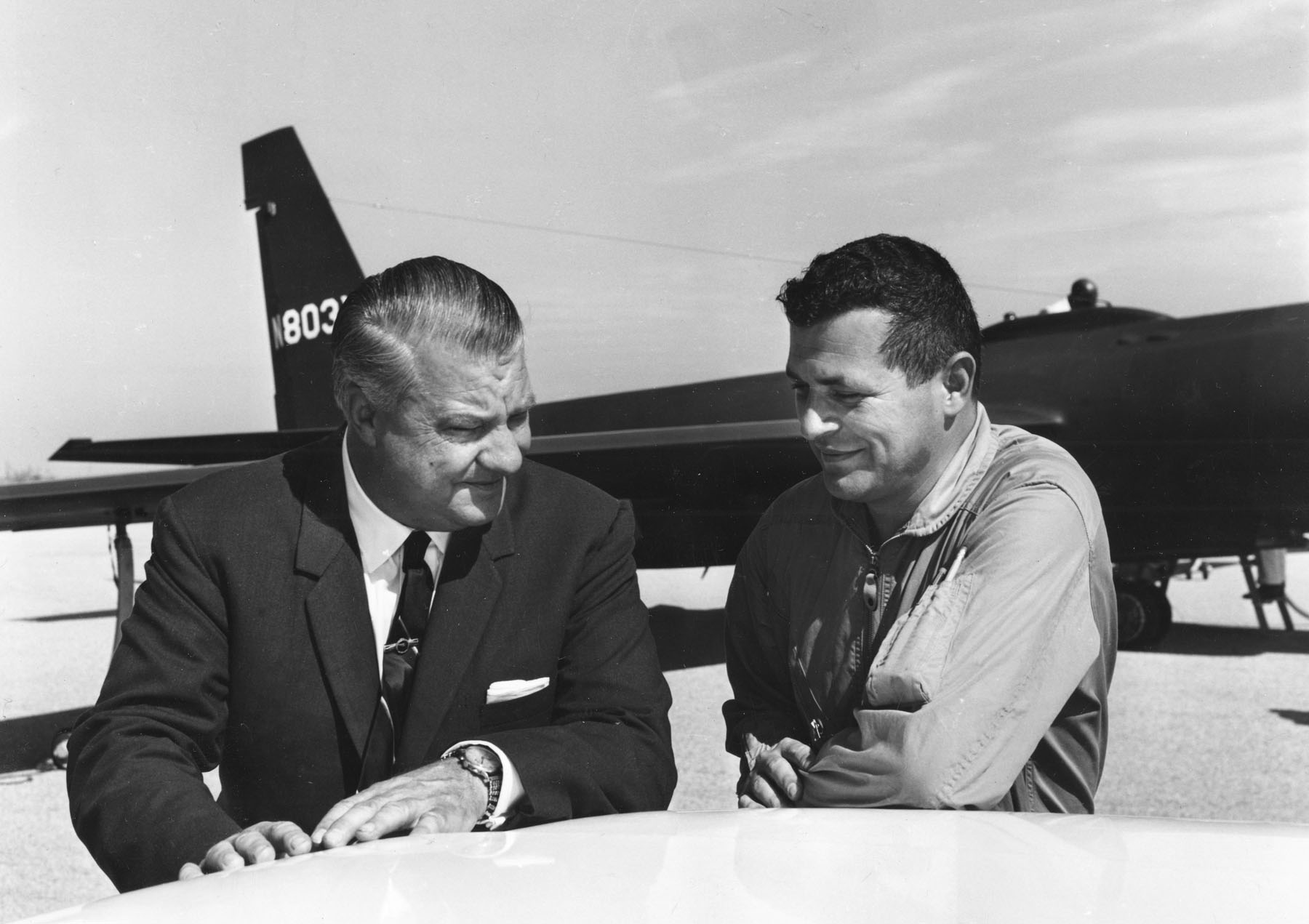
Kelly Johnson and Gary Powers in front of a U-2

Bissell and other project officials believed that surviving a U-2 accident from above 70,000 feet was impossible, so they used the pre-existing cover story. On 3 May, the National Aeronautics and Space Administration (NASA, the successor to NACA) announced that one of its aircraft, making a high-altitude research flight in Turkey, was missing; the government planned to say, if necessary, that the NASA aircraft had drifted with an incapacitated pilot across the Soviet border. By remaining silent, Khrushchev lured the Americans into reinforcing the cover story until he revealed on 7 May that Powers was alive and had confessed to spying on the Soviet Union. Eisenhower turned down Dulles' offer to resign and publicly took full responsibility for the incident on 11 May; by then all overflights had been canceled. The Paris Summit collapsed after Khrushchev, as the first speaker, demanded an apology from the U.S., which Eisenhower refused.

U-2 pilots were told, Knutson later said, if captured "to tell them everything that they knew", because they were told little about their missions other than targets on maps. Otherwise, Powers had little instruction on what to do during an interrogation. Although he had been told that he could reveal everything about the aircraft since the Soviets could learn what they wanted from it, Powers did his best to conceal classified information while appearing to cooperate. His trial began on 17 August 1960. Powers—who apologized on the advice of his Soviet defense counsel—was sentenced to three years in prison, but on 10 February 1962 the USSR exchanged him and American student Frederic Pryor for Rudolf Abel at Glienicke Bridge between West Berlin and Potsdam, Germany. Two CIA investigations found that Powers had done well during the interrogation and had "complied with his obligations as an American citizen during this period". Although the government was reluctant to reinstate him to the USAF because of its statements that the U-2 program was civilian, it had promised to do so after CIA employment ended; Powers resolved the dilemma by choosing to work for Lockheed as a U-2 pilot.

The debris of Powers's aircraft was used to design a copy under the name Beriev S-13. That was then discarded in favor of the MiG-25R and reconnaissance satellites.

The search for operational ballistic missile sites continued focusing on the Soviet railway system using Corona satellite images, with a resolution of twenty to thirty feet compared to two to three feet from U-2 cameras.

==== Restructuring ====
The U-2 shootdown in 1960 paralyzed the U.S. reconnaissance community and forced changes in policy, procedures, and security protocol. The United States also had to move swiftly to protect its allies: for example after the Soviets announced that Powers was alive, the CIA evacuated the British pilots from Detachment B as Turkey did not know of their presence in the country. The end of Soviet overflights meant that Detachment B itself soon left Turkey, and in July Detachment C left Japan following a Japanese governmental request. Both detachments merged into Detachment G, under the command of Lt. Col. William Gregory, at Edwards Air Force Base, California where the CIA had relocated the U-2 program after nuclear testing forced it to abandon Groom Lake in 1957.

The CIA sought to determine if the U-2 could, from a fixed base at North Edwards, rapidly deploy to an advanced American base and complete reconnaissance flights on a largely self-sustaining basis. A proving exercise was arranged with Gregory and the new Detachment G unit to simulate deploying a U-2 unit overseas, taking two or three aircraft, and conducting three reconnaissance missions with no resupply. The exercise was critical to continued CIA operation of the U-2, since basing the aircraft in a foreign country was no longer an option. The exercise was completed with excellent results, and actual reconnaissance missions began to be scheduled immediately.

On 4 January 1961, the CIA U-2 reconnaissance effort, which was formerly known as CHALICE, was redesignated IDEALIST. This program codeword by the end of the decade was being used to describe the U.S. reconnaissance along the Chinese coastline, while Taiwanese missions into the Chinese country would be known as the IDEALIST program

By the next U-2 flight, in October 1960 over Cuba, the previously informal procedure in which the president personally approved or disapproved each flight after discussion with advisors was replaced by the National Security Council Special Group. The expansion of satellite intelligence partly compensated for the overflights' end but, because U-2 photographs remained superior to satellite imagery, future administrations considered resumption at times, such as during the Berlin Crisis of 1961.

==== Cuba ====
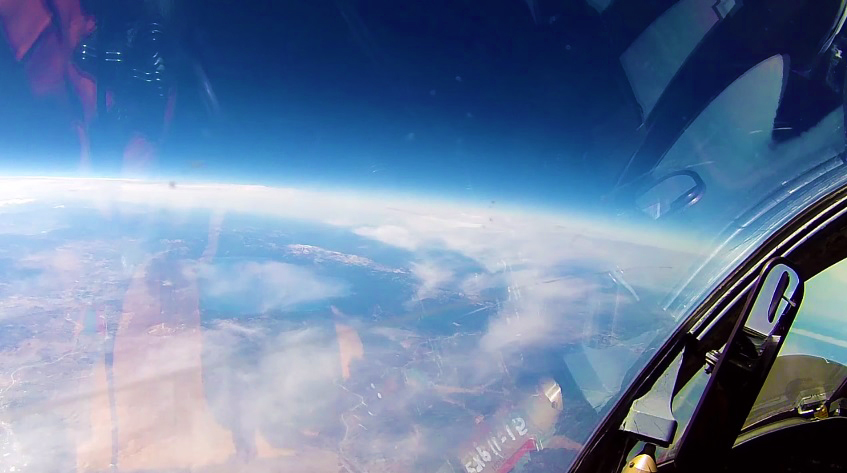
External view from cockpit of U-2 near maximum service ceiling, 2017

===== Bay of Pigs Invasion =====
As many as 15 U-2 sorties provided support for the April 1961 Bay of Pigs Invasion of Cuba by the United States. Scientists such as Edwin H. Land and James Rhyne Killian, who had originally conceived the U-2 and had advocated for its development and deployment as a tool of scientific reconnaissance, felt betrayed by the use of the U-2 for "dirty tricks" covert operations, such as the Bay of Pigs invasion. Richard M. Bissel, the CIA official in charge of both the U-2 program and CIA covert operations, including the Bay of Pigs Invasion, had been a good friend of Land and Killian, but such use of the U-2s strained their friendship.

From October 1960, Detachment G made many overflights of Cuba from Laughlin Air Force Base, Texas. Although Lockheed modified six CIA aircraft into the aerial refueling-capable U-2F model in 1961, permitting some Cuba missions to originate from Edwards, pilot fatigue limited flights to about 10 hours. An August 1962 flight showed Soviet SA-2 SAM sites on the island; later overflights found more sites and MiG-21 interceptors. The increasing number of SAMs caused the United States to more cautiously plan Cuban overflights. USAF U-2s did not conduct overflights, but officials believed that it would be better for a military officer to be the pilot in case he was shot down. Following one last Cuba overflight that originated from Edwards and ended at McCoy Air Force Base, Florida, on 14 October 1962, all further U-2 operations over Cuba originated from a detachment operating location that was established at McCoy.

===== Cuban Missile Crisis =====
After receiving hasty training on the more powerful U-2F under the cognizance of the Weather Reconnaissance Squadron Provisional (WRSP-4) at Edwards AFB, Major Richard S. Heyser flew over western Cuba on 14 October 1962 in a U-2F; his aircraft was the first to photograph Soviet medium-range ballistic missiles (MRBM) in San Cristóbal before returning to McCoy AFB, Florida. Prior to the launch of all Cuban sorties, the two U-2F aircraft possessed by WSRP-4 and flown by 4080th Strategic Reconnaissance Wing personnel had USAF insignia and tail numbers.

SAC received permission to fly as many Cuban overflights as necessary for the duration of the resulting Cuban Missile Crisis. On a 27 October sortie from McCoy AFB, one of the U-2Fs was shot down over Cuba by an SA-2 Guideline surface-to-air missile, killing the pilot, Major Rudolf Anderson; he posthumously received the first Air Force Cross.

Soviet leader Nikita Khrushchev was dismayed, warning President John F. Kennedy in a private message that U-2 overflights could inadvertently cause WWIII: "Is it not a fact that an intruding American plane could be easily taken for a nuclear bomber, which might push us to a fateful step?"

Fulfilling CIA officials' fears of a USAF takeover, CIA pilots never again flew over Cuba; SAC retained control over Cuban overflights, which continued until the 1970s under the code name OLYMPIC FIRE.

At the same time as the Cuban crisis, Royal Air Force (RAF) English Electric Lightnings of the Air Fighting Development Squadron made several practice interceptions against U-2s; guided by ground controllers and using energy climb profiles, the Lightning could intercept the U-2 at up to 65,000 ft.

===== Hickman incident =====
On 28 July 1966, a U-2 piloted by USAF Captain Robert Hickman departed from Barksdale Air Force Base to conduct a reconnaissance mission; Hickman's orders included the requirement that he not enter Cuban airspace. As determined later by USAF investigators, trouble with the aircraft's oxygen system caused Hickman to lose consciousness. U.S. Navy pilot John Newlin, flying an F-4B assigned to VF-74, was scrambled from Naval Air Station Key West, ordered to intercept Hickman before he violated Cuban airspace, and, if necessary, shoot him down. Newlin could not reach the U-2 before flying closer than 12 miles from the Cuban coastline and so had to turn back. Hickman probably died from oxygen deprivation before the intercept was attempted. Hickman's U-2 flew across Cuba, ran out of fuel and crashed into a mountainside near Llanquera, Bolivia. The Bolivian military gave his remains an honor guard at a nearby chapel. The US embassy to Bolivia sent a team to investigate the crash site.

From 1960 to 1965, U-2 flights originated or terminated on a nearly daily basis at Albrook USAF base. In 1966, elements of the USAF's 4080th Strategic Reconnaissance Wing flew U-2s from Albrook to perform atmospheric sampling as the French detonated a nuclear device in the South Pacific.

==== Asia ====
CIA overflights of Asian targets began in spring 1958 when Detachment C moved from Japan to Naval Air Station Cubi Point in the Philippines to overfly Indonesia during an uprising against Sukarno's "Guided Democracy" government. The CIA's Civil Air Transport, aiding the rebels, so badly needed pilots that it borrowed two CIA U-2 pilots despite the high risk to the U-2 program if one were captured. The Indonesian government soon defeated the rebels, however, and the U-2s returned to Japan. That year, Detachment C also flew over the Chinese coast near Quemoy during the Second Taiwan Strait Crisis to see if Communist Chinese forces were preparing to invade, and in 1959 aided CIA operations during the Tibetan uprising. The unit was collecting high-altitude air samples to look for evidence of Soviet nuclear tests when it was withdrawn from Asia after the May 1960 U-2 incident.

On 24 September 1959, an unmarked U-2, Article 360, crash landed to Fujisawa Airfield of Japan. Armed American security forces in plainclothes soon arrived and moved away locals at gunpoint, increasing public interest in the crash. The unlawfulness of the Black Jet Incident was criticized in Japan's House of Representatives. The same Article 360 was later shot down in the May 1960 U-2 incident. A month before the incident, another U-2 crash landed in rural Thailand. Locals helped the US remove the aircraft without publicity.

Detachment G pilots began using the unmarked Taiwanese "Detachment H" U-2 for North Vietnam overflights in February 1962, but as tactical intelligence became more important, after the Gulf of Tonkin Resolution of August 1964 SAC took over all U-2 missions in Indochina. In late November 1962, Detachment G was deployed to Takhli Royal Thai Air Force Base, Thailand, to carry out overflights of the Chinese-Indian border area after Indian prime minister Jawaharlal Nehru requested military aid following the Sino-Indian War in October–November 1962. In 1963, India agreed to an American request for a permanent U-2 base for Soviet and Chinese targets, offering Charbatia, although it was only briefly used and Takhli remained Department G's main Asian base. After the Vietnamese ceasefire in January 1973 prohibited American military flights, CIA pilots again used the unmarked Detachment H U-2 over North Vietnam during 1973 and 1974. Several U-2s were lost over China.

In 1963, the CIA started project Whale Tale to develop carrier-based U-2Gs to overcome range limitations. During the development of the capability, CIA pilots took off and landed U-2Gs on the aircraft carrier Ranger and other ships. The U-2G was used only twice operationally. Both flights from Ranger occurred in May 1964 to observe France's development of an atomic bomb test range at Moruroa in French Polynesia.

In reality, as of that date (May 1964), no development work had yet begun on the Moruroa atoll. The first infrastructure was not built until the end of 1964.

===== Vietnam War =====
In early 1964, SAC sent a detachment of U-2s from the 4080th to South Vietnam for high altitude reconnaissance missions over North Vietnam. On 5 April 1965, U-2s from the 4028th Strategic Reconnaissance Squadron (SRS) took photos of SAM-2 sites near Hanoi and Haiphong harbor. On 11 February 1966, the 4080th Wing was redesignated the 100th Strategic Reconnaissance Wing (100 SRW) and moved to Davis-Monthan AFB, Arizona. The detachment at Bien Hoa AB, South Vietnam, was redesignated the 349th SRS.

The only loss of a U-2 during combat operations occurred on 9 October 1966, when Major Leo Stewart, flying with the 349th Strategic Reconnaissance Squadron, developed mechanical problems high over North Vietnam. The U-2 managed to return to South Vietnam where Stewart ejected safely. The U-2 crashed approximately 65 miles (105 km) east-northeast of Saigon in Viet Cong (VC) territory. A Special Forces team was later sent to destroy the wreckage. One member stated that they retrieved classified radar jammers from the wreckage before they could be captured by the VC and possibly transferred to the USSR. In July 1970, the 349th SRS at Bien Hoa moved to Thailand and was redesignated the 99th SRS in November 1972, remaining there until March 1976.

==== U-2 carrier operations ====
At one time, in an effort to extend the U-2's operating range and to eliminate the need for foreign government approval for U-2 operations from USAF bases in foreign countries, it was suggested that the U-2 be operated from aircraft carriers. Three aircraft were converted for carrier operations by the installation of arrester hooks, and carrier-qualified naval aviators were recruited to fly them.

It turned out to be possible to take off and land a U-2 from a carrier. Testing in 1964 with the USS Ranger and in 1969 with the USS America proved the concept. The only operational carrier use occurred in May 1964 when a U-2, operating from USS Ranger, was used to spy on a French atomic test in the Pacific. The Lockheed C-130 was also tested for carrier use to support U-2 sea deployments.

In 1969, the larger U-2Rs were flown from the carrier America. The U-2 carrier program is believed to have been halted after 1969.

==== 1970–2000 ====
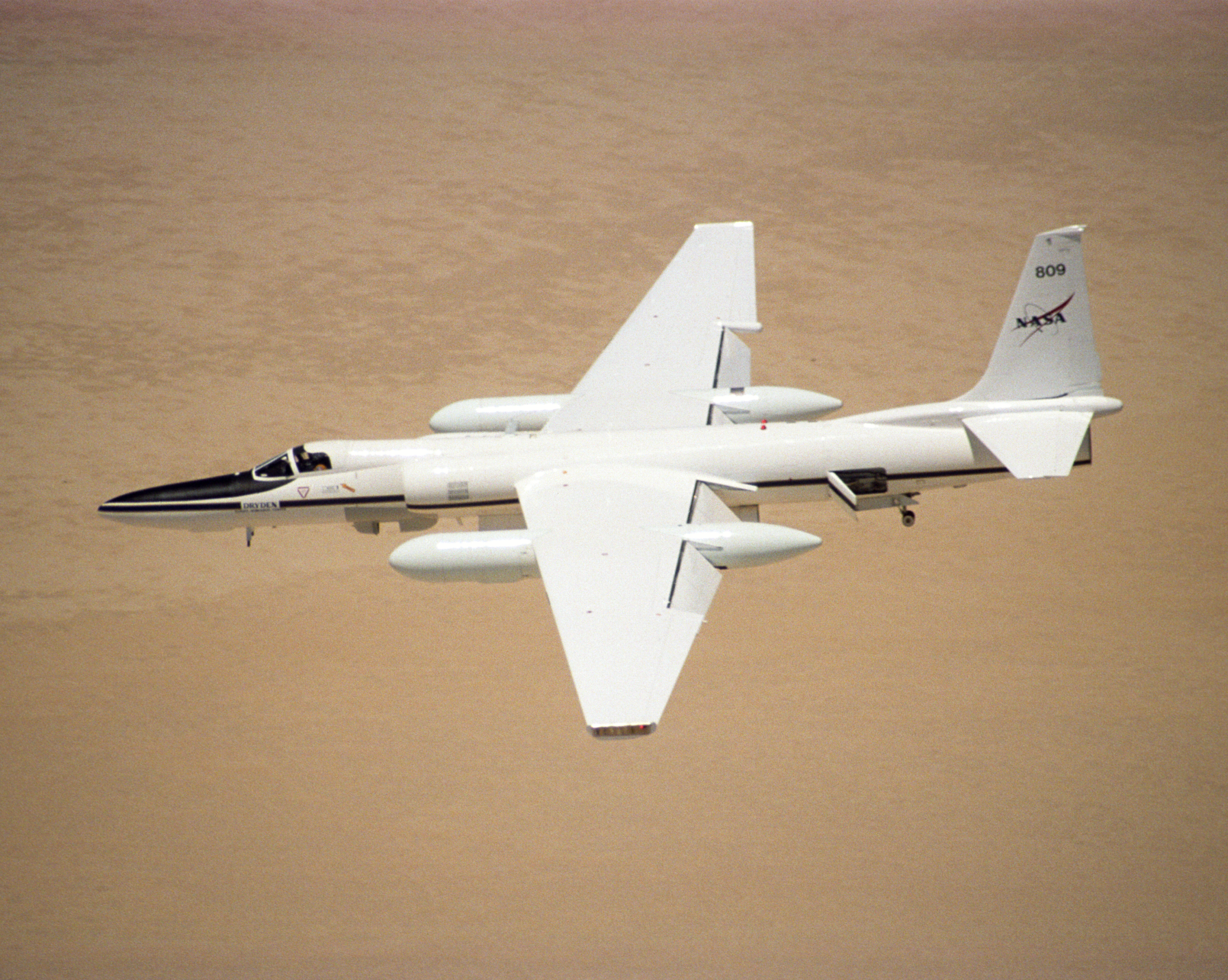
One of NASA's ER-2s in flight over the California desert, 2001. A NASA ER-2 set the world altitude record for its weight class.

In August 1970, two U-2Rs were deployed by the National Reconnaissance Office (NRO) to cover the Israeli-Egypt conflict under the code name EVEN STEVEN.

In June 1976, the U-2s of the 100 SRW were transferred to the 9th Strategic Reconnaissance Wing (9 SRW) at Beale Air Force Base, California, and merged with Lockheed SR-71 Blackbird operations there. When the Strategic Air Command (SAC) was disbanded in 1992, the wing was transferred to the new Air Combat Command (ACC) and redesignated the 9th Reconnaissance Wing (9 RW).

In 1977, a U-2R was retrofitted with an upward-looking window so that it could be used for high altitude astronomical observations of the cosmic microwave background (CMB). This experiment was the first to measure definitively the motion of the galaxy relative to the CMB and established an upper limit on the rotation of the universe as a whole.

In 1984, during a major NATO exercise, RAF Flight Lieutenant Mike Hale intercepted a U-2 at a height of 66,000 feet (20,100 m), where the aircraft had previously been considered safe from interception. Hale climbed to 88,000 feet (26,800 m) in his Lightning F3.

In 1989, a U-2R of 9th Reconnaissance Wing (RW), Detachment 5, flying from Patrick Air Force Base, Florida successfully photographed a space shuttle launch for NASA to assist in identifying the cause of tile loss during launch, which had been discovered in the initial post-Challenger missions.

On 2 January 1993, an Iraqi MiG-25 Foxbat attempted to intercept a USAF U-2 taking part in UN operations over Iraq. The R-40 (AA-6 Acrid) missile missed the U-2 and the MiG was 'chased off' by F-15 Eagles.

On 19 November 1998, a NASA ER-2 research aircraft set a world record for altitude of 20,479 meters (67,190 ft) in horizontal flight in the 12,000 to 16,000 kg (26,000 to 35,000 lb) weight class.

==== 21st century ====
The U-2 remains in front-line service more than 60 years after its first flight, with the current U-2 beginning service in 1980. This is due primarily to its ability to change surveillance objectives on short notice, something that surveillance satellites cannot do. In the mid-1990s, it was converted from the U-2R to the U-2S, receiving the GE F118 turbofan engine. The U-2 outlasted its Mach 3 replacement, the SR-71, which was retired in 1998. A classified budget document approved by the Pentagon on 23 December 2005 called for the U-2's termination no earlier than 2012, with some aircraft being retired by 2007. In January 2006, Secretary of Defense Donald Rumsfeld announced the U-2's pending retirement as a cost-cutting measure during a larger reorganization and redefinition of the USAF's mission. Rumsfeld said that this would not impair the USAF's ability to gather intelligence, which would be done by satellites and a growing supply of unmanned RQ-4 Global Hawk reconnaissance aircraft.

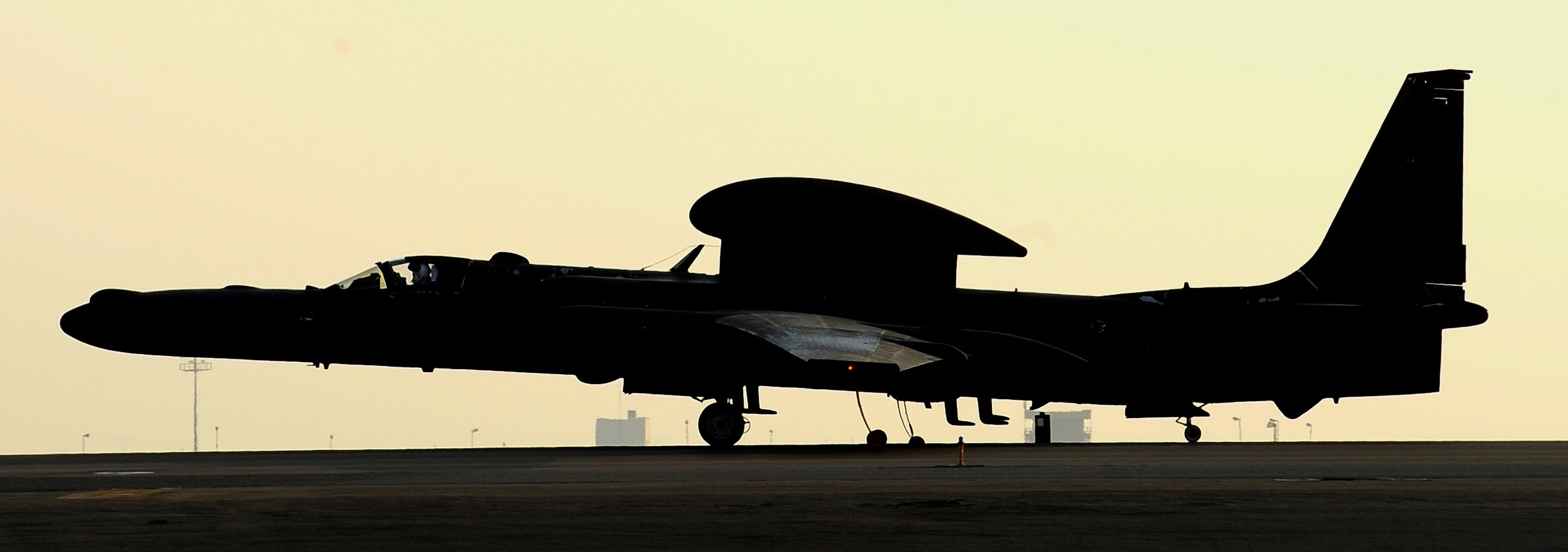
U-2S with the Senior Span/Spur communications suite at Al Dhafra Air Base, United Arab Emirates, ca. 2017

In 2009, the USAF stated that it planned to extend the U-2 retirement from 2012 until 2014 or later to allow more time to field the RQ-4. Upgrades late in the War in Afghanistan gave the U-2 greater reconnaissance and threat-detection capability. By early 2010, U-2s from the 99th Expeditionary Reconnaissance Squadron had flown over 200 missions in support of Operations Iraqi Freedom and Enduring Freedom, as well as Combined Joint Task Force – Horn of Africa.

A U-2 was stationed in Cyprus in March 2011 to help in the enforcement of the no-fly zone over Libya, and a U-2 stationed at Osan Air Base in South Korea was used to provide imagery of the Japanese nuclear reactor damaged by the 11 March 2011 earthquake and tsunami.

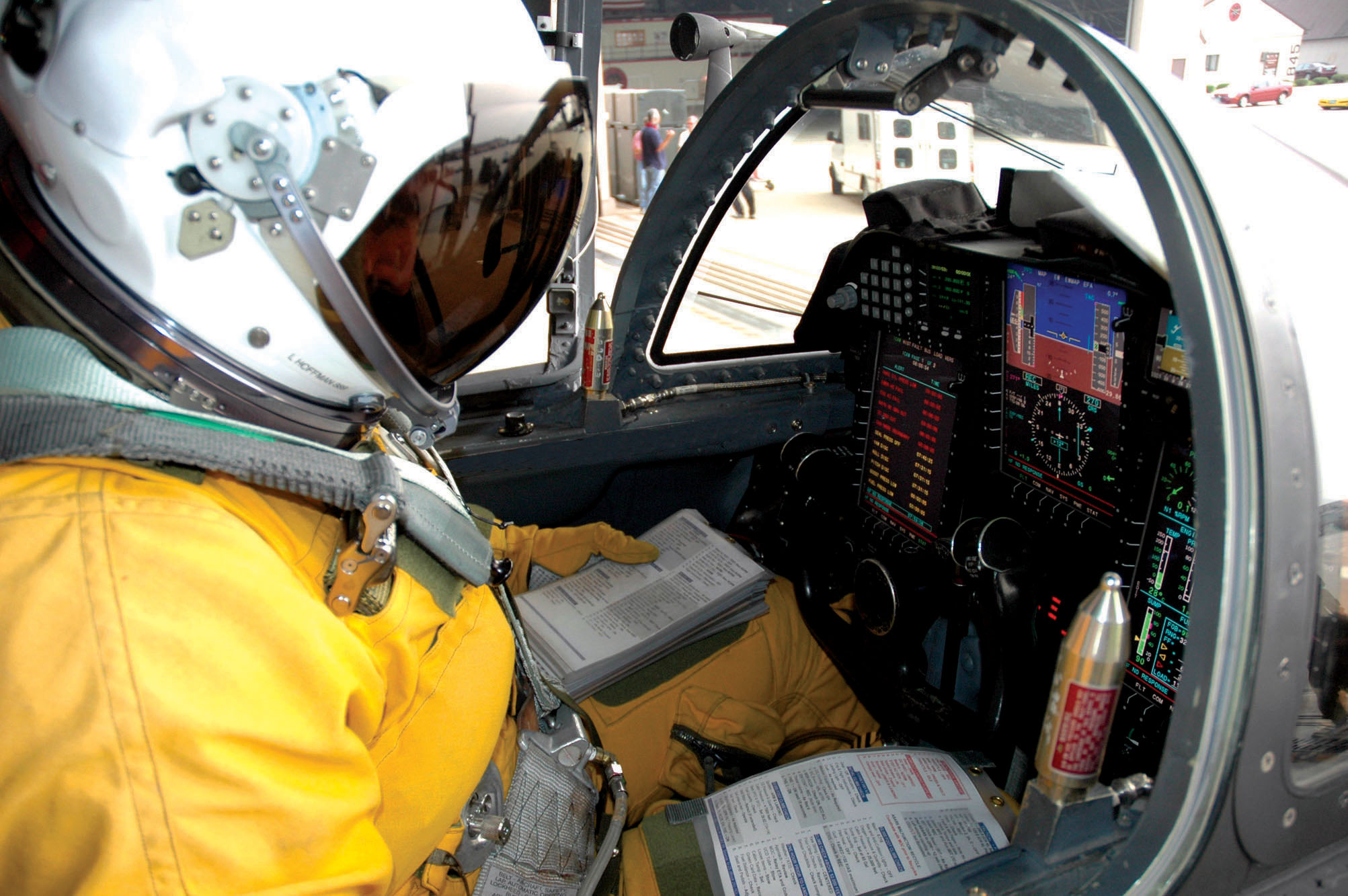
Cockpit of a U-2S Block 20, at Osan Air Base, South Korea, circa June 2006

In March 2011, it was projected that the fleet of 32 U-2s would be operated until 2015. In 2014, Lockheed Martin determined that the U-2S fleet had used only one-fifth of its design service life and was one of the youngest fleets within the USAF. In 2011 the USAF intended to replace the U-2 with the RQ-4 before fiscal year 2015; proposed legislation required any replacement to have lower operating costs. In January 2012 the USAF reportedly planned to end the RQ-4 Block 30 program and extend the U-2's service life until 2023. The RQ-4 Block 30 was kept in service under political pressure despite USAF objections, stating that the U-2 cost $2,380 per flight hour compared to the RQ-4's $6,710 as of early 2014. Critics have pointed out that the RQ-4's cameras and sensors are less capable, and lack all-weather operating capability; however, some of the U-2's sensors may be installed on the RQ-4. The RQ-4 Block 30's capabilities were planned to match the U-2's by FY 2016, the replacement effort is motivated by decreases in the RQ-4's cost per flying hour.

The U-2's retirement was calculated to save $2.2 billion. $1.77 billion will have to be spent over 10 years to enhance the RQ-4, including $500 million on a universal payload adapter to attach one U-2 sensor onto the RQ-4. USAF officials fear that retiring the U-2 amid RQ-4 upgrades will create a capability gap In the House Armed Services Committee's markup of the FY 2015 budget, language was included prohibiting the use of funds to retire or store the U-2; it also requested a report outlining the transition capabilities from the U-2 to the RQ-4 Block 30 in light of capability gap concerns.

In late 2014, Lockheed Martin proposed an unmanned U-2 version with greater payload capability, but the concept did not gain traction with the USAF. In early 2015, the USAF was directed to restart modest funding for the U-2 for operations and research, development, and procurement through to FY 2018. The former head of the USAF Air Combat Command, Gen. Mike Hostage helped extend the U-2S to ensure commanders receive sufficient intelligence, surveillance and reconnaissance (ISR) coverage; stating "it will take eight years before the RQ-4 Global Hawk fleet can support 90% of the coverage of the U-2 fleet." In 2015, the RQ-4 was planned to replace the U-2 by 2019, though Lockheed states the U-2 can remain viable until 2050. As of January 2018, the U.S. Air Force budget for 2018 had indefinitely postponed the retirement of the U-2. In February 2020, the U.S. Air Force submitted budget documents with confusing language suggesting that it could begin retiring U-2s in 2025 but clarified afterwards that no retirement is planned.

On 20 September 2016, a TU-2S trainer crashed upon takeoff from Beale Air Force Base, killing one pilot and injuring the other.

In early August 2018, NASA flew two missions using infrared sensors to map the Mendocino Complex Fire. The flights used the Moderate Resolution Imaging Spectroradiometer (MODIS) and Advanced Spaceborne Thermal Emission and Reflection Radiometer (ASTER) satellite instruments.

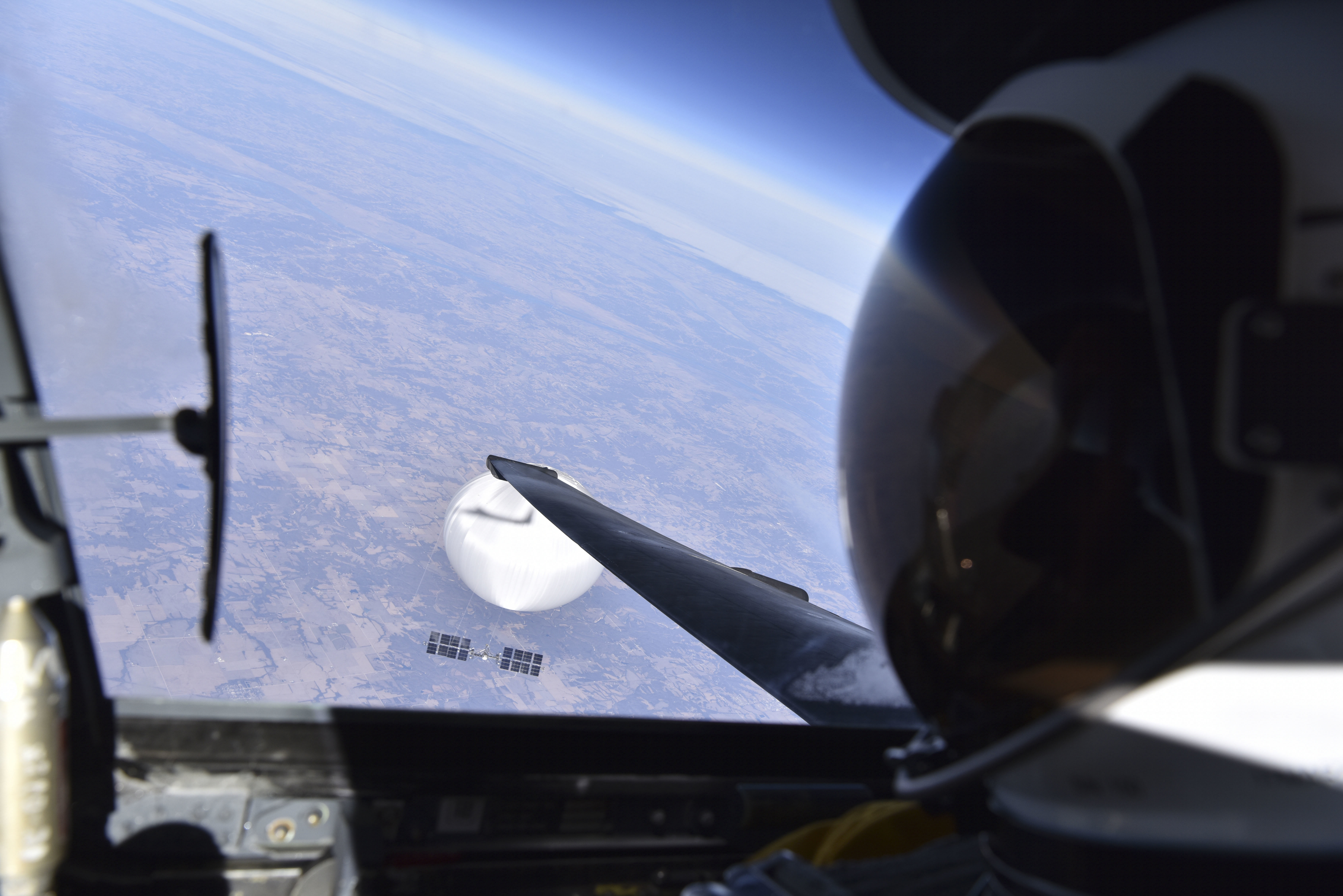
U-2 pilot takes a selfie with both the U-2 shadow and the balloon while surveilling the Chinese asset over the US during the 2023 Chinese balloon incident

In 2020, the U-2 made history as the first military aircraft to integrate Artificial Intelligence on a mission. The AI program, code-named ARTUμ, was developed by the U-2 Federal Laboratory.

In the 2023 Chinese balloon incident, the U.S. Air Force used U-2 aircraft to monitor a Chinese balloon that crossed the United States and Canada. U-2 flights confirmed the balloon's surveillance package was outfitted with multiple antennas capable of conducting signals intelligence collection operations and that the craft had large solar panels to power them.

In 2025, Air Force Chief of Staff General David Allvin confirmed that the U-2 was being used to surveil the US-Mexico border. The U-2 and RC-135 Rivet Joint were used for ISR operations to track cartels located in Mexico.

Also in 2025, as fleet retirement is being discussed, a TU-2S trainer set an endurance record for the class, by flying 11,100 km (6,000 nmi) in 14 hours over all 48 lower US states.

=== United Kingdom ===
Bissell suggested bringing the British into the program to increase the number of overflights. Prime Minister Harold Macmillan agreed with the plan, and four RAF officers were sent to Laughlin Air Force Base in Texas for training in May 1958. On 8 July, the senior British pilot, Squadron Leader Christopher H. Walker, was killed when his U-2 malfunctioned and crashed near Wayside, Texas. This was the first death involving the U-2, and the circumstances were not disclosed for over 50 years. Another pilot was quickly selected and sent to replace Walker. After training, the group of RAF U-2 pilots arrived in Turkey in November 1958, shortly after the CIA's Detachment B from Adana provided valuable intelligence during the 1958 Lebanon crisis with both the United States and United Kingdom involvement. Since the September 1956 disclosure of Mediterranean photographs, the United Kingdom had received U-2 intelligence, except during the Suez Crisis. The CIA and Eisenhower viewed using British pilots as a way of increasing plausible deniability for the flights. The CIA also saw British participation as a way of obtaining additional Soviet overflights that the president would not authorize. The United Kingdom gained the ability to target flights toward areas of the world the United States was less interested in, and possibly avoid another Suez-like interruption of U-2 photographs.

Although the RAF unit operated as part of Detachment B, the UK formally received title to the U-2s their pilots would fly, and Eisenhower wrote to Macmillan that because of the separate lines of authority, the nations were conducting "two complementary programs rather than a joint one". A secret MI6 bank account paid the RAF pilots, whose cover was employment with the Meteorological Office. While most British flights occurred over the Middle East during the two years the UK program existed, two missions over Soviet sites were very successful. The first targeted two missile test ranges, three nuclear complexes, and a large segment of railway in one of the test range areas. Operational ballistic missile sites were considered most likely close to railways but none were found. A second flight had as its main target the long-range bomber airfield at Saratov/Engels. The number of Bison long-range aircraft counted on the airfield settled the "bomber gap" controversy. Other targets were a missile test center and aircraft, aircraft engine and missile production plants. A new bomber with two engines at the base of the fin, the Tupolev Tu-22, was discovered at one of the aircraft plants. Like Eisenhower, Macmillan personally approved the Soviet overflights. The British direct involvement in overflights ended after the May 1960 U-2 downing incident; although four pilots remained stationed in California until 1974, the CIA's official history of the program stated that "RAF pilots never again conducted another overflight in an Agency U-2." In 1960 and 1961 the first four pilots received the Air Force Cross, but their U-2 experience remained secret.

=== Taiwan ===
Official emblem of the Black Cat Squadron

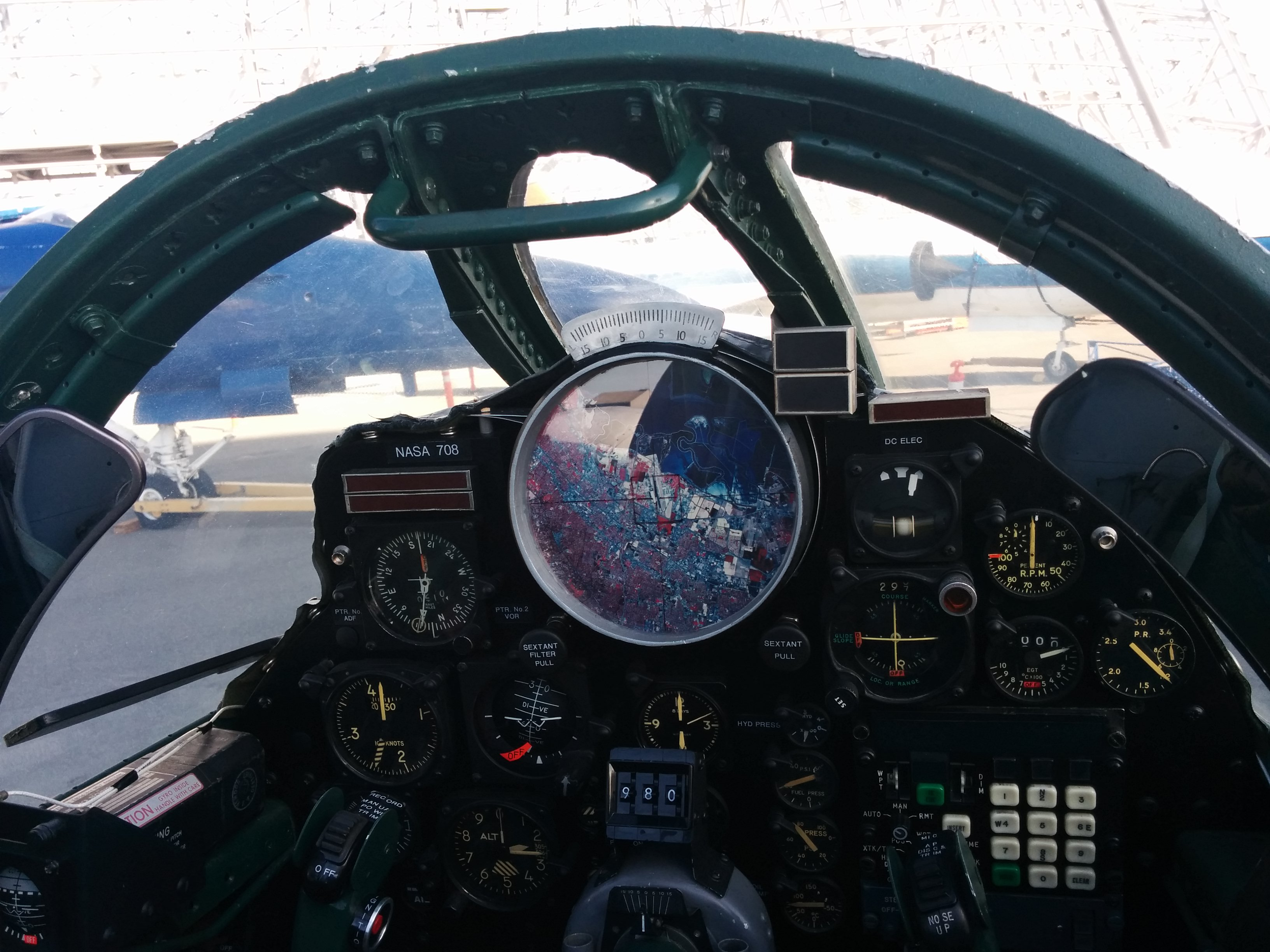
U-2 pilot's view in the cockpit: The large circular monitor is vital for navigation, evading interceptors and surface-to-air missiles as early as possible, 2016.

Beginning in the 1950s, Taiwan's Republic of China Air Force (ROCAF) used the RB-57D aircraft for reconnaissance missions over the People's Republic of China (PRC), but suffered two losses when MiG-17s and S-75 Dvina (SA-2) surface-to-air missiles intercepted and downed the aircraft.

Taiwanese and American authorities reached an agreement in 1958 to create the 35th Squadron, nicknamed the Black Cat Squadron, composed of two U-2Cs in Taoyuan Air Base in northern Taiwan, at an isolated part of the air base. To create misdirection typical of the time, the unit was created under the cover of high altitude weather research missions for ROCAF. To the U.S. government, the 35th Squadron and any U.S. CIA/USAF personnel assigned to the unit were known as Detachment H on all documents. But instead of being under normal USAF control, the project was known as Project Razor, and was run directly by the CIA with USAF assistance. Each of the 35th Squadron's operational missions had to be approved by both the U.S. and the ROC presidents beforehand. A further layer of security and secrecy was enforced by all U.S. military and CIA/government personnel stationed in Taoyuan assigned to Detachment H having been issued official documents and IDs with false names and cover titles as Lockheed employees/representatives in civilian clothes. The ROCAF personnel would never know their U.S. counterparts' real names and rank/titles, or which U.S. government agencies they were dealing with. A total of 26 of 28 ROC pilots sent to the U.S. completed training between 1959 and 1973, at Laughlin Air Force Base, Texas. On 3 August 1959, a U-2 on a training mission out of Laughlin AFB, piloted by ROCAF Major Mike Hua, made a successful unassisted nighttime emergency landing at Cortez, Colorado, that became known as the Miracle at Cortez. Major Hua was awarded the USAF Distinguished Flying Cross for saving the aircraft.

In January 1961, the CIA provided the ROC with its first two U-2Cs, and in April the squadron flew its first mission over mainland China. In the wake of the Gary Powers incident, the Taiwanese program of China overflights was redesignated TACKLE, a subset of the new IDEALIST program. Other countries were occasionally overflown by the 35th Squadron, including North Korea, North Vietnam and Laos; however, the main objective of the 35th Squadron was to conduct reconnaissance missions assessing the PRC's nuclear capabilities. For this purpose, the ROC pilots flew as far as Gansu and other remote regions in northwest China. Some missions, to satisfy mission requirements including range, and to add some element of surprise, had the 35th Squadron's U-2s flying from or recovered at other U.S. air bases in Southeast Asia and Eastern Asia, such as Kunsan Air Base in South Korea, or Takhli in Thailand. All U.S. airbases in the region were listed as emergency/alternate recovery airfields and could be used besides the 35th Squadron's home base at Taoyuan Air Base in Taiwan. Initially, all film taken by the Black Cat Squadron would be flown to Okinawa or Guam for processing and development, and the U.S. forces would not share any mission photos with ROC. In the late 1960s, the USAF agreed to share complete sets of mission photos and help set up a photo development and interpretation unit at Taoyuan.

In 1968, the ROC U-2C/F/G fleet was replaced with the newer U-2R. However, with the overwhelming threats from S-75 Dvina (SA-2) missiles and MiG-21 interceptors, along with the rapprochement between the U.S. and the PRC, the ROC U-2s stopped entering Chinese airspace, only conducting electronic intelligence-gathering and photo-reconnaissance missions using new Long Range Oblique Reconnaissance (LOROP) cameras on the U-2R from above international waters. The last U-2 mission over mainland China took place on 16 March 1968. After that, all missions had the U-2 fly outside a buffer zone at least 20 nautical miles (37 km) around China.

During his visit to China in 1972, U.S. president Richard Nixon promised the Chinese to cease all reconnaissance missions near and over China, though this was also practical as by 1972 U.S. photo satellites could provide better overhead images without risking losing aircraft and pilots, or provoking international incidents. The last 35th Squadron mission was flown by Sungchou "Mike" Chiu on 24 May 1974.

By the end of the ROC's U-2 operations, a total of 19 U-2C/F/G/R aircraft had been operated by the 35th Squadron from 1959 to 1974. The squadron flew some 220 missions, with about half over mainland China, resulting in five aircraft shot down, with three fatalities and two pilots captured; one aircraft lost while performing an operational mission off the Chinese coast, with the pilot killed; and another seven aircraft lost in training with six pilots killed. On 29 July 1974, the two remaining U-2R aircraft in ROC possession were flown from Taoyuan Air Base in Taiwan to Edwards AFB, California, US, and turned over to the USAF.

== Variants ==
=== Primary list ===
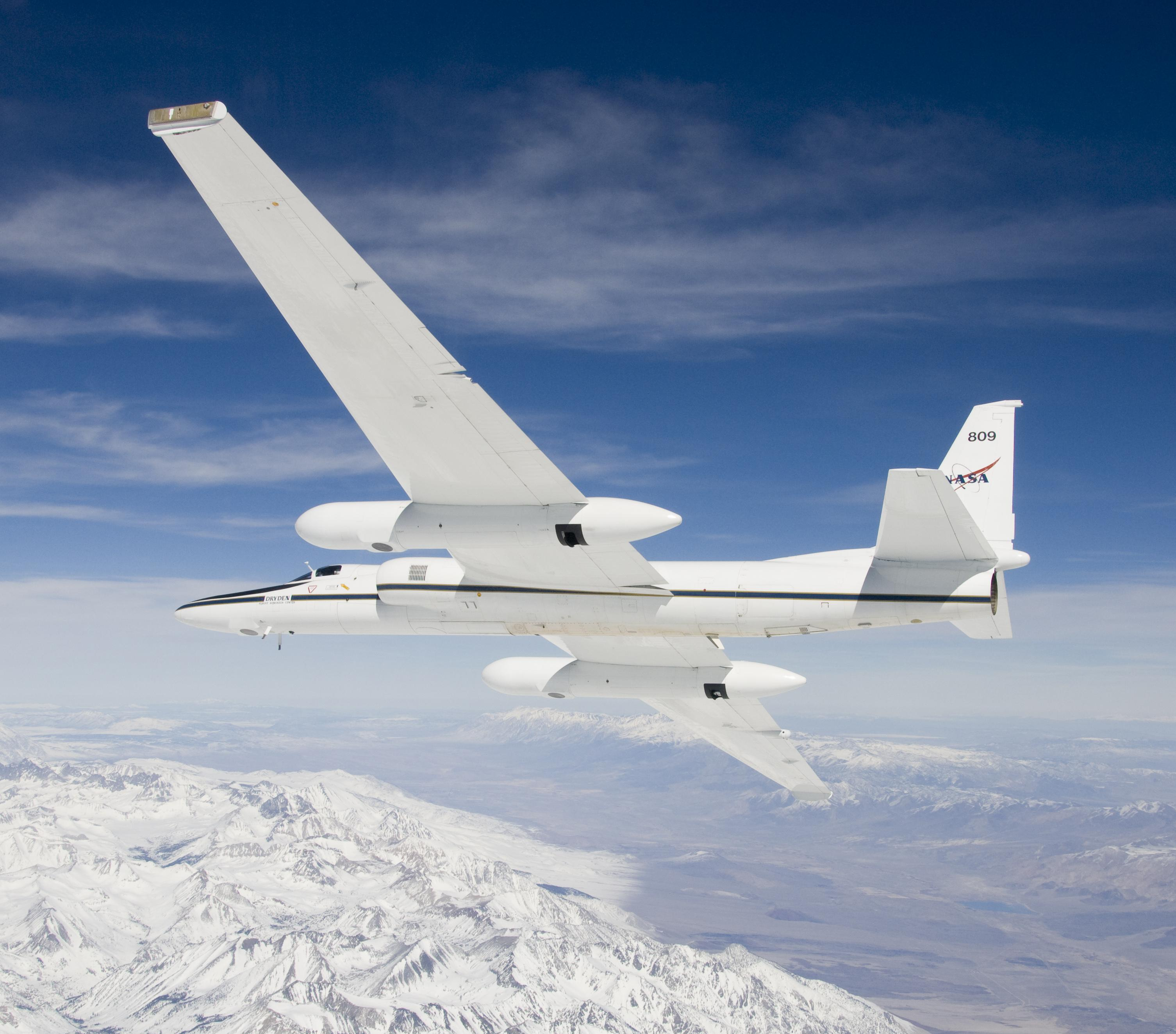
A NASA ER-2 atmospheric research aircraft in flight, 2008

Production aircraft (104 total)

U-2A
Initial production, single-seat; Pratt & Whitney J57-P-37A engine; 49 built
U-2D
2 seat used for various IR detection programs, not a trainer aircraft.; 6 built
U-2R
Re-designed airframes enlarged nearly 30 percent with underwing pods and increased fuel capacity; 12 built
U-2R(T)
Enhanced two-seat R-model trainer; 1 built
ER-2
Two aircraft, AF Ser. No. 80-1063 new build, and Ser. No. 80-1097 converted from TR-1A, built/modified as Earth resources research aircraft, moved from USAF to NASA and operated by the NASA High-Altitude Missions Branch, Ames Research Center. NASA flies Ser. No. 80-1097 as N809NA and Ser. No. 80-1063 as N806NA.; 1 built/1 converted
TR-1A
A third production batch of U-2R aircraft built for high-altitude tactical reconnaissance missions with the ASARS-2 side-looking radar, new avionics, and improved ECM equipment; 33 built. Re-designated U-2R after the fall of the Soviet Union.
TR-1B
Two-seat conversion trainers; 2 built. Redesignated U-2R(T), later TU-2S.

Converted aircraft

U-2B
Missile warning patrol aircraft; 1 converted
U-2C
Enhanced single-seat model with Pratt & Whitney J75-P-13 engine and modified engine intakes; 13 converted
U-2CT
Enhanced two-seat trainer; 2 converted
U-2E
Aerial refueling capable, J57-powered; not built
U-2F
Aerial refueling capable, J75-powered; 5 converted
U-2G
C-models modified with reinforced landing gear, added arresting hook, and lift dump spoilers on the wings for U.S. Navy carrier operations; 2 converted
U-2H
Aircraft carrier capable, aerial refueling capable; not built
U-2S
Redesignation of the TR-1A and U-2R aircraft with updated General Electric F118 engine, improved sensors, and addition of a GPS receiver; 31 converted
TU-2S
New redesignated TR-1B two-seat trainer with improved engine; 5 converted
WU-2
Atmospheric/weather research WU-model; 1 converted

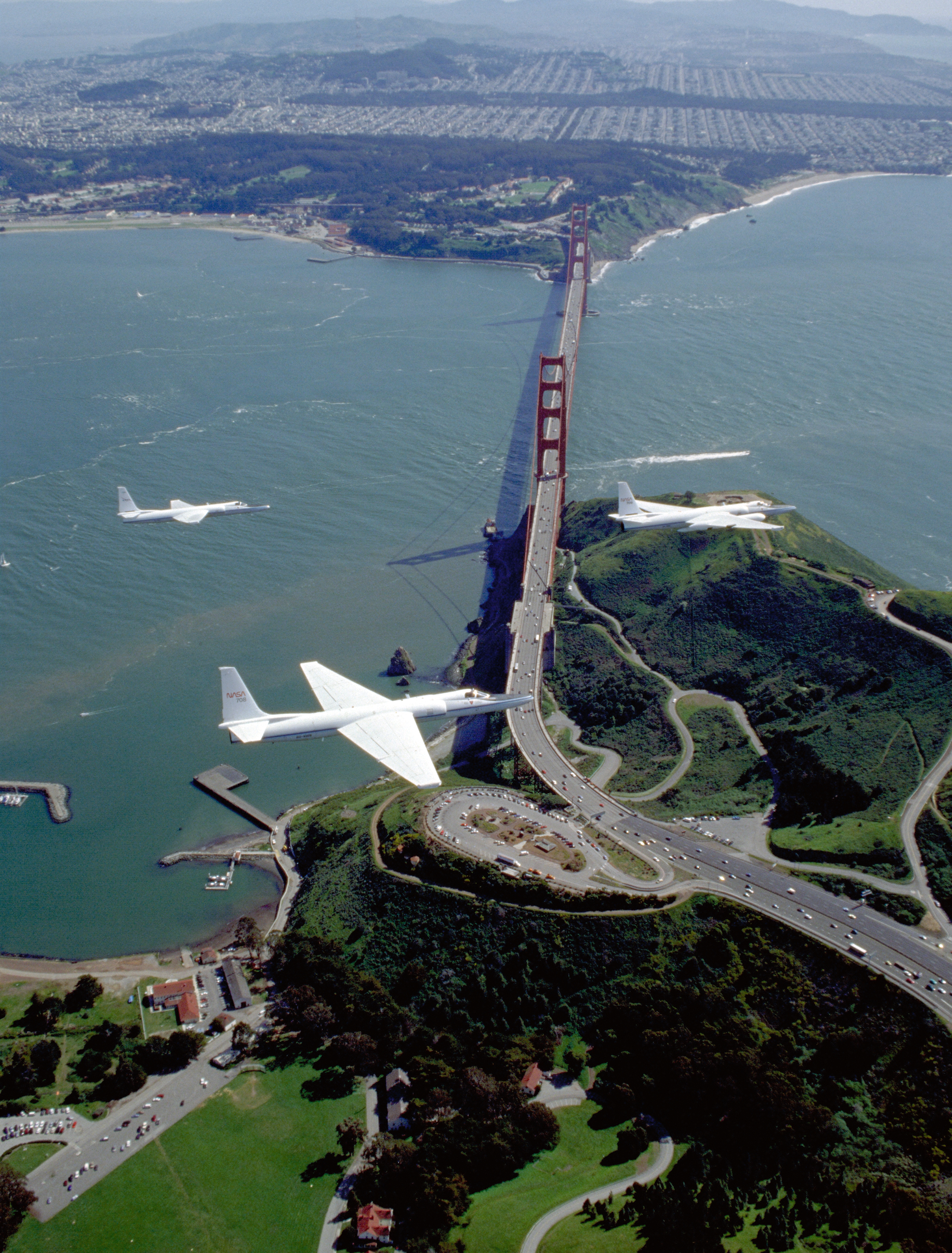
The second ER-2 (lead aircraft) and two U-2Ss on a demonstration flight from Moffett Field before moving to Edwards Air Force Base, 1996. The farthest aircraft was modified from the first ER-2.

=== U-2E/F/H details ===
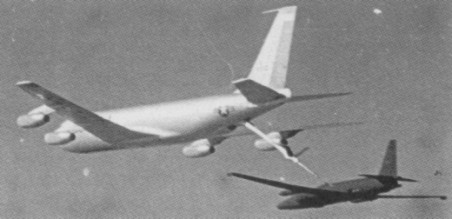
A Lockheed U-2F being refueled by a KC-135Q

In May 1961, in an attempt to extend the U-2's already considerable range, Lockheed modified six CIA U-2s and several USAF U-2s with aerial refueling equipment, which allowed the aircraft to receive fuel from either the KC-97 or from the KC-135. This extended the aircraft's range from approximately 4,000 to 8,000 nautical miles (7,400 to 15,000 km) and extended its endurance to more than 14 hours. The J57-powered U-2Bs were re-designated U-2E and the J75-powered U-2Cs were redesignated U-2F. Each modified U-2 also included an additional oxygen cylinder. However, pilot fatigue was not considered, and little use was made of the refueling capability. The only U-2H was both air refueling-capable and carrier-capable.

=== U-2R/S details ===
The U-2R, first flown in 1967, is significantly larger and more capable than the original aircraft. A tactical reconnaissance version, the TR-1A, first flew in August 1981. A distinguishing feature of these aircraft is the addition of a large instrumentation "superpod" under each wing. Designed for standoff tactical reconnaissance in Europe, the TR-1A was structurally identical to the U-2R. The 17th Reconnaissance Wing, RAF Alconbury, England used operational TR-1As from 1983 until 1991. The last U-2 and TR-1 aircraft were delivered to USAF in October 1989. In 1992 all TR-1s were re-designated to U-2R for uniformity across the fleet. The two-seat trainer variant of the TR-1, the TR-1B, was redesignated as the TU-2R. After upgrading with the GE F118-101 engine, the former U-2Rs were designated the U-2S Senior Year.

=== ER-2 details ===
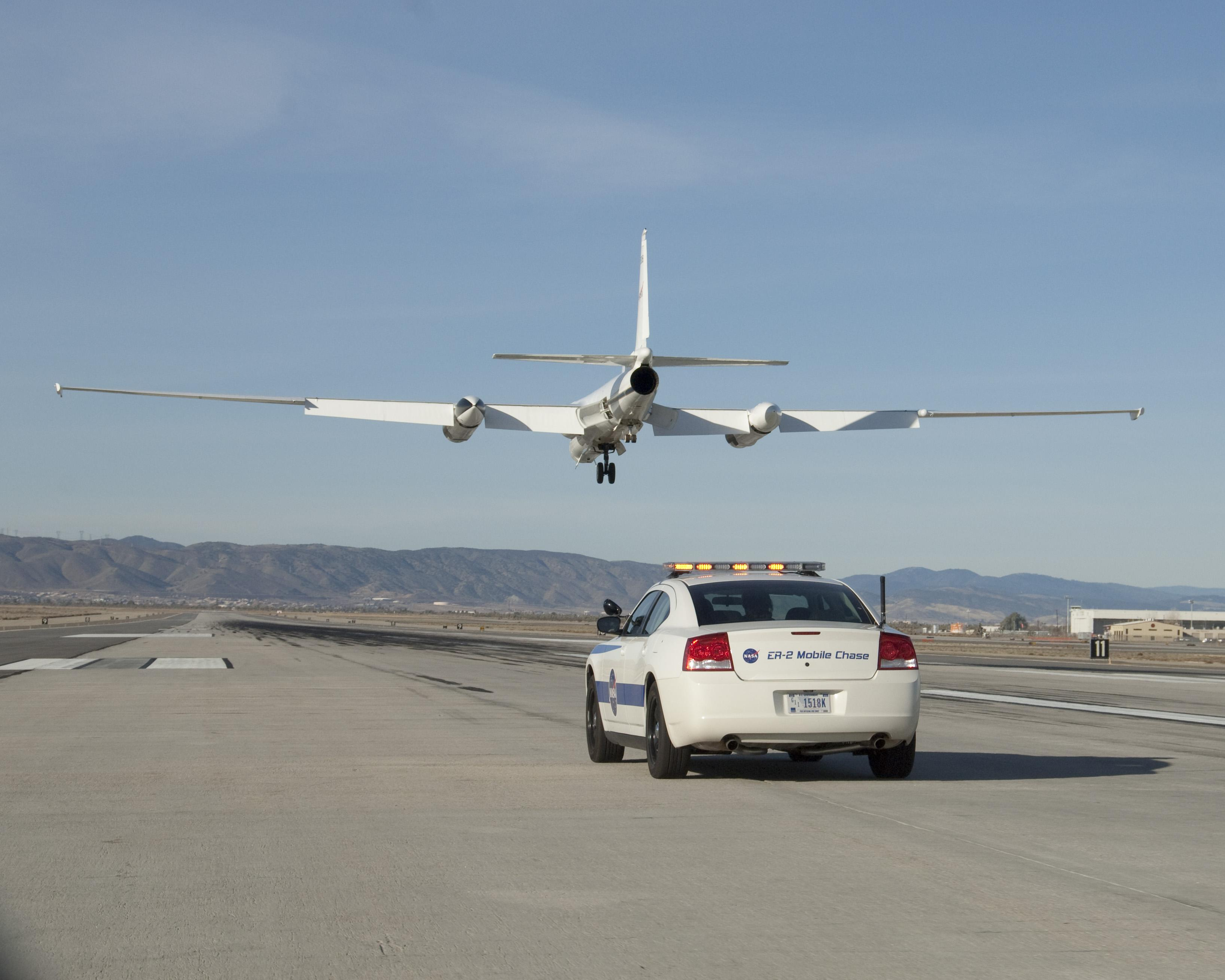
An ER-2 being chased by a support vehicle on landing, 2010

A derivative of the U-2 known as the ER-2 (Earth Resources 2), in NASA's white livery, is based at the Dryden Flight Research Center (now Armstrong Flight Research Center) and is used for high-altitude civilian research including Earth resources, celestial observations, atmospheric chemistry and dynamics, and oceanic processes. Programs using the aircraft include the Airborne Science Program, ERAST and Earth Science Enterprise. Landings are assisted by another pilot at speeds exceeding 120 miles per hour (190 km/h) in a chase car.

== Operators ==
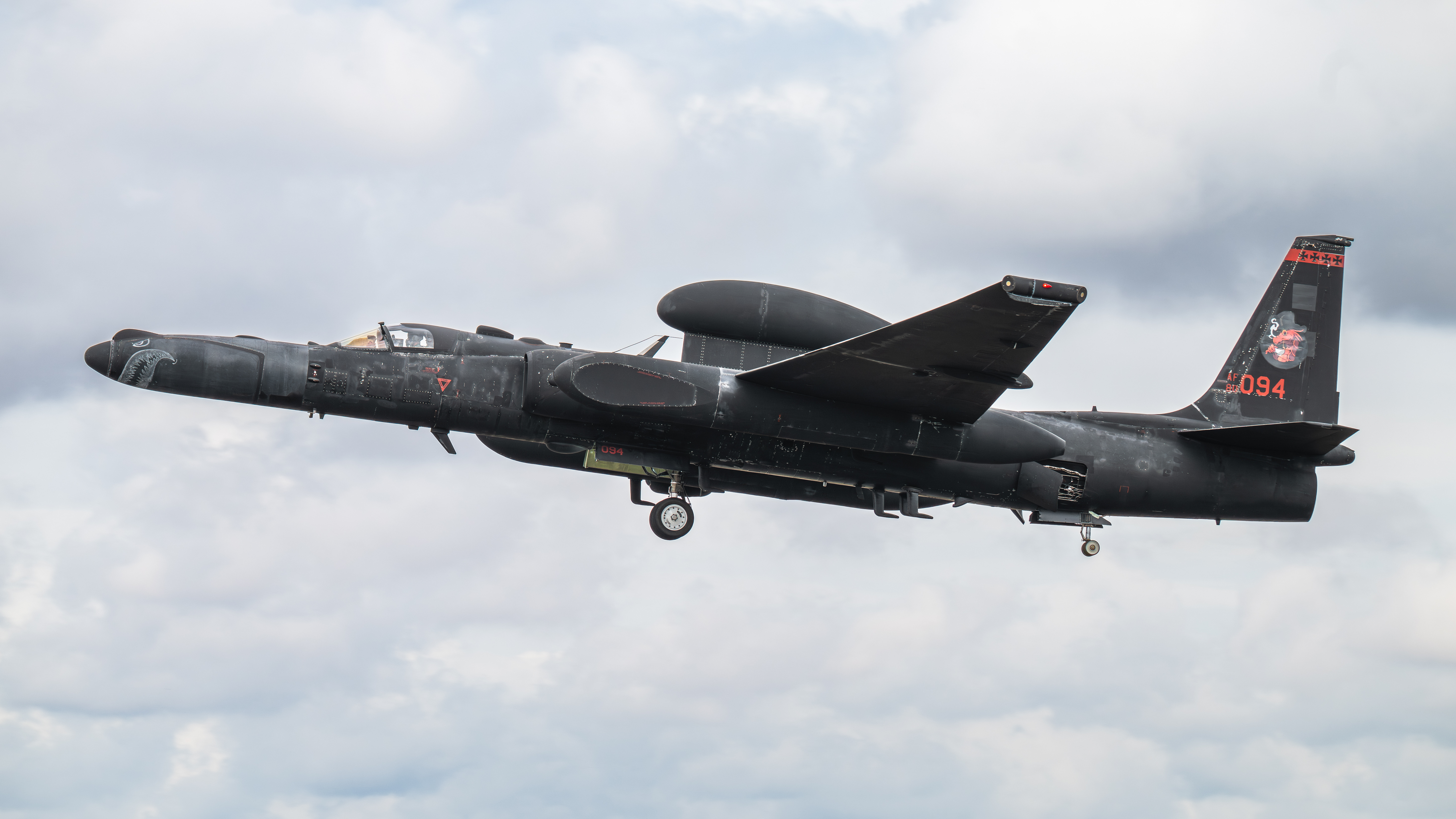
U-2S of the USAF 99th Reconnaissance Squadron at RAF Fairford

United States

United States Air Force

Strategic Air Command

- 9th Strategic Reconnaissance Wing – Beale Air Force Base, California 1976–1992

1st Strategic Reconnaissance Squadron 1990–1992
5th Strategic Reconnaissance Training Squadron 1986–1992
95th Strategic Reconnaissance Squadron 1991–1992 (RAF Alconbury, UK)
99th Strategic Reconnaissance Squadron 1976–1992
4029th Strategic Reconnaissance Squadron 1981–1986
9 SRW Detachment 2; Osan Air Base, South Korea 1976–1992
9 SRW Detachment 3; RAF Akrotiri, Cyprus 1970–1992
9 SRW Detachment 4; RAF Mildenhall, UK 1976–1982
9 SRW Detachment 5; Patrick AFB, FL 1976–1992

- 17th Reconnaissance Wing – RAF Alconbury, UK 1982–1991

95th Reconnaissance Squadron

- 100th Strategic Reconnaissance Wing – Davis-Monthan Air Force Base, Arizona 1966–1976

99th Strategic Reconnaissance Squadron 1972–1976 (U-Tapao Air Base, Thailand)
349th Strategic Reconnaissance Squadron 1966–1976

- 1700th Reconnaissance Wing (Provisional) – Al Taif Air Base, Saudi Arabia 1990–1992

1704th Reconnaissance Squadron

- 4080th Strategic Reconnaissance Wing – Laughlin Air Force Base, Texas 1957–1966

4028th Strategic Reconnaissance Squadron

Air Combat Command

- 9th Reconnaissance Wing – Beale Air Force Base, California 1992–present

1st Reconnaissance Squadron 1992–present
5th Reconnaissance Squadron 1994–present (Osan Air Base, South Korea)
95th Reconnaissance Squadron 1992–1993
99th Reconnaissance Squadron 1992–present
Detachment 2; Osan AB, South Korea 1992–1994
Detachment 3; RAF Akrotiri, Cyprus 1992–present
Detachment 4; RAF Alconbury, UK 1993–1995

RAF Fairford, UK 1995–1998; 2019–present
Istres AB, France 1998–2000

- 363d Air Expeditionary Wing – Prince Sultan Air Base, Saudi Arabia 1998–2003

99th Expeditionary Reconnaissance Squadron

- 380th Air Expeditionary Wing – Al Dhafra Air Base, United Arab Emirates 2003–present

99th Expeditionary Reconnaissance Squadron

- 4404th Provisional Wing – Prince Sultan AB, Saudi Arabia 1992–1998

4402d Reconnaissance Squadron

Air Force Flight Test Center – Edwards Air Force Base, California

- 6510th Test Group

4th Weather Reconnaissance Squadron (Provisional) 1956–1960
6512th Test Squadron 1960–1980

- 1130th Air Technical Training Group 1969–1974

National Aeronautics and Space Administration – Moffett Field, California (1981–1997); Palmdale, California (1997–present)

Central Intelligence Agency – 1956–1974

Detachment A, Germany
Detachment B, Turkey
Detachment C, Japan
Detachment G, California

United Kingdom

- Royal Air Force – 1958–1960
  - CIA Detachment B, Turkey

Taiwan

- Republic of China Air Force – 1960–1974
  - 35th Black Cat Squadron

== Aircraft on display ==
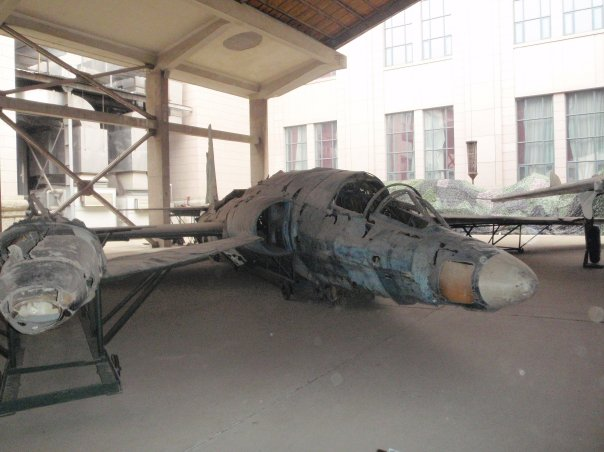
U-2C 56-6691 wreckage restored and on display at the Military Museum of the Chinese People's Revolution, Beijing

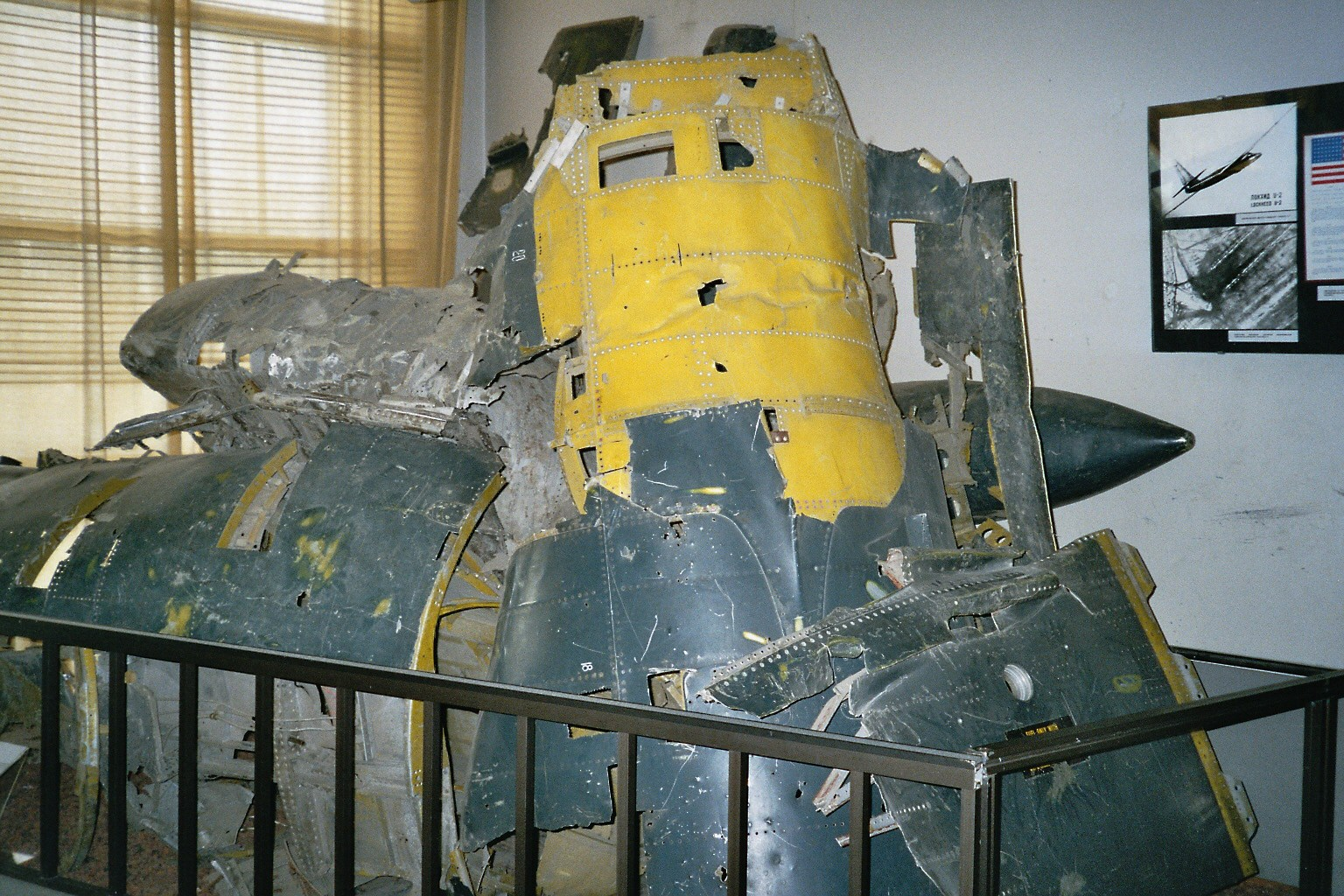
Part of the wreckage of U-2 56-6693 (Article 360) on display in Moscow

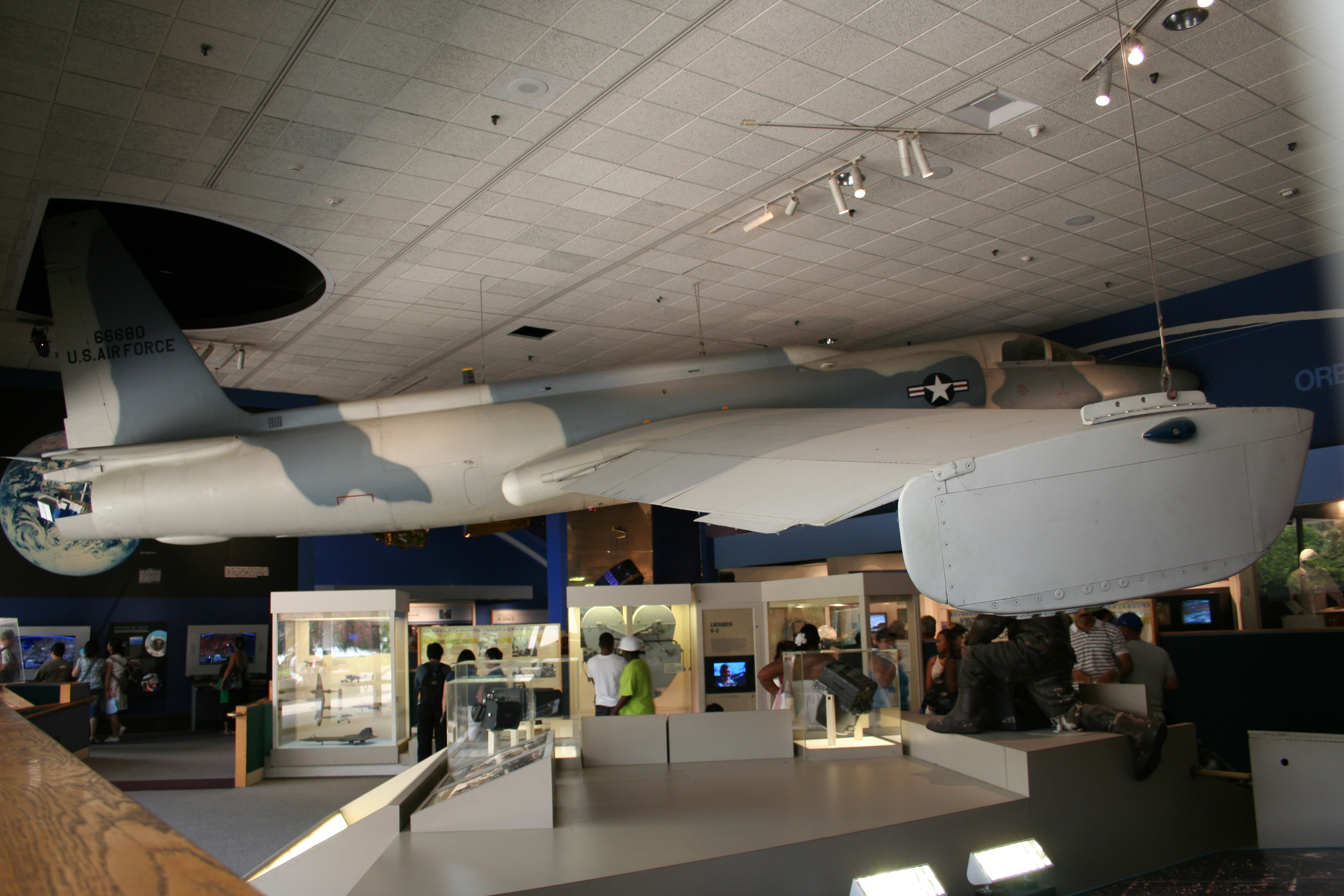
U-2 56-6680 on display at the National Air and Space Museum in Washington, DC

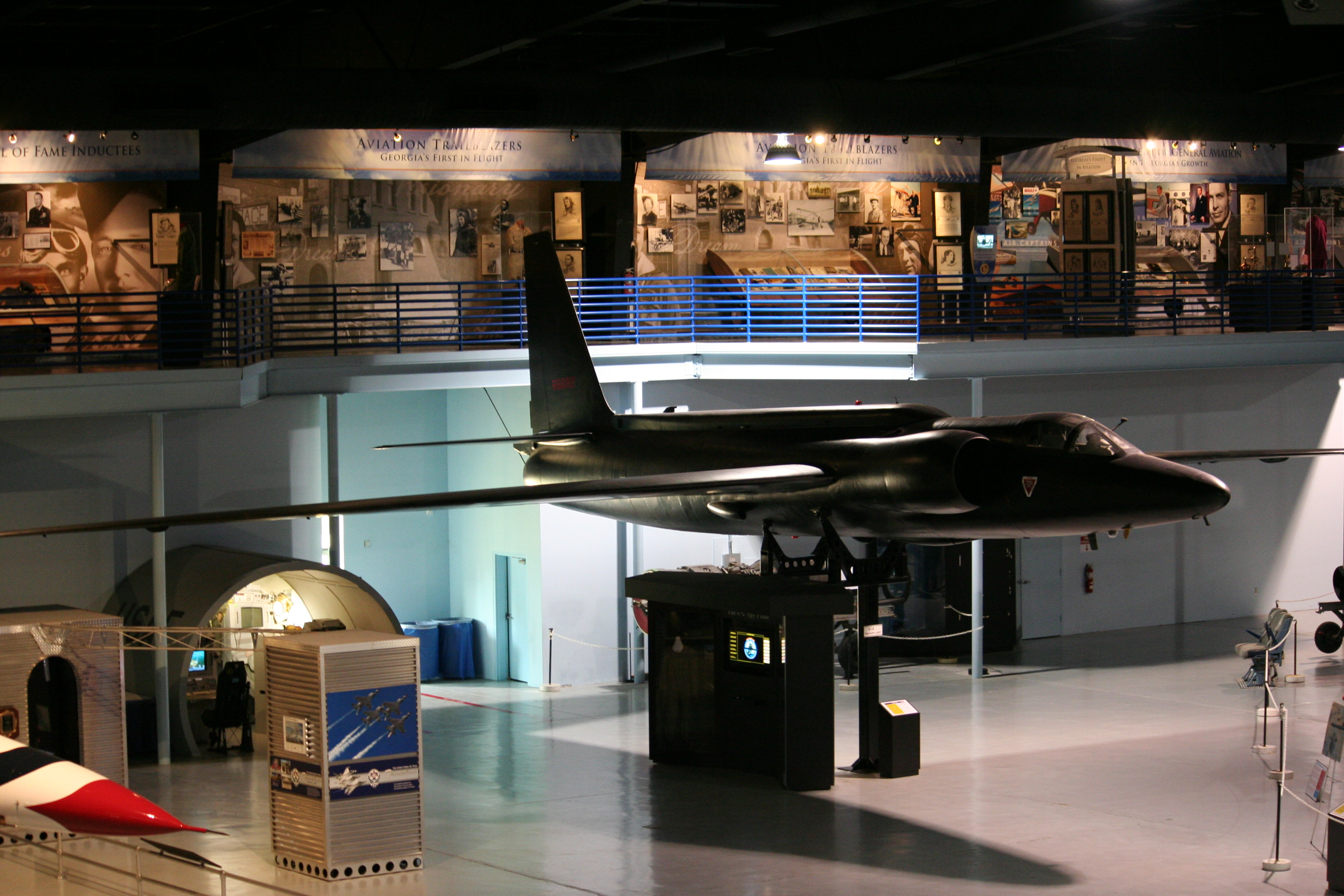
U-2 56-6682 on display at the Museum of Aviation at Robins Air Force Base, Georgia

=== China ===
U-2C

- 56-6691 – wreckage is on display at the Military Museum of the Chinese People's Revolution, Beijing. It has been re-assembled and is on display in the aircraft exhibit hall. This airframe, flown by the Republic of China Air Force pilot Jack Chang, was downed on 10 January 1965, northwest of Beijing by a S-75 Dvina missile.

=== Cuba ===
U-2F

- 56-6676 – wreckage is on display at three museums in Cuba. It was flown by Major Rudolf Anderson, USAF, and was shot down during the Cuban Missile Crisis on 27 October 1962 by a Soviet-supplied S-75 Dvina (NATO designation SA-2 Guideline) surface-to-air missile near Banes, Cuba. One of the engine intakes is at the Museo de la Lucha contra Bandidos in Trinidad. The engine and portion of the tail assembly are at the Museum of the Revolution in Havana. The right wing, a portion of the tail assembly, and front landing gear are at the Fortaleza de San Carlos de la Cabaña, or La Cabaña, Havana. The two latter groups of parts were previously displayed at the Museo del Aire, Havana.

=== Norway ===
U-2C

- 56-6953 – Norwegian Aviation Museum, Bodø

=== Russia ===
U-2C

- 56-6693 – wreckage is on display at the Central Armed Forces Museum, Moscow. It was flown by Francis Gary Powers and was shot down on 1 May 1960 near Sverdlovsk (now Yekaterinburg).

=== United Kingdom ===
U-2CT

- 56-6692 – Imperial War Museum Duxford

=== United States ===
U-2A

- 56-6722 – National Museum of the United States Air Force, Wright-Patterson AFB, Ohio

U-2C

- 56-6680 – National Air and Space Museum in Washington, DC
- 56-6681 – Moffett Field Museum, Moffett Federal Airfield, Santa Clara County, California
- 56-6701 – Strategic Air and Space Museum, in Ashland, Nebraska
- 56-6707 – Laughlin Air Force Base, Texas
- 56-6716 – Hill Aerospace Museum, Hill Air Force Base, Utah

U-2D

- 56-6682 – Museum of Aviation, Robins Air Force Base, Georgia
- 56-6714 – Beale Air Force Base, California
- 56-6721 – Blackbird Airpark Air Force Plant 42 in Palmdale, California

U-2R/U-2S

- 80-1084 - National Museum of Nuclear Science and History, Albuquerque, NM

== Specifications (U-2S) ==
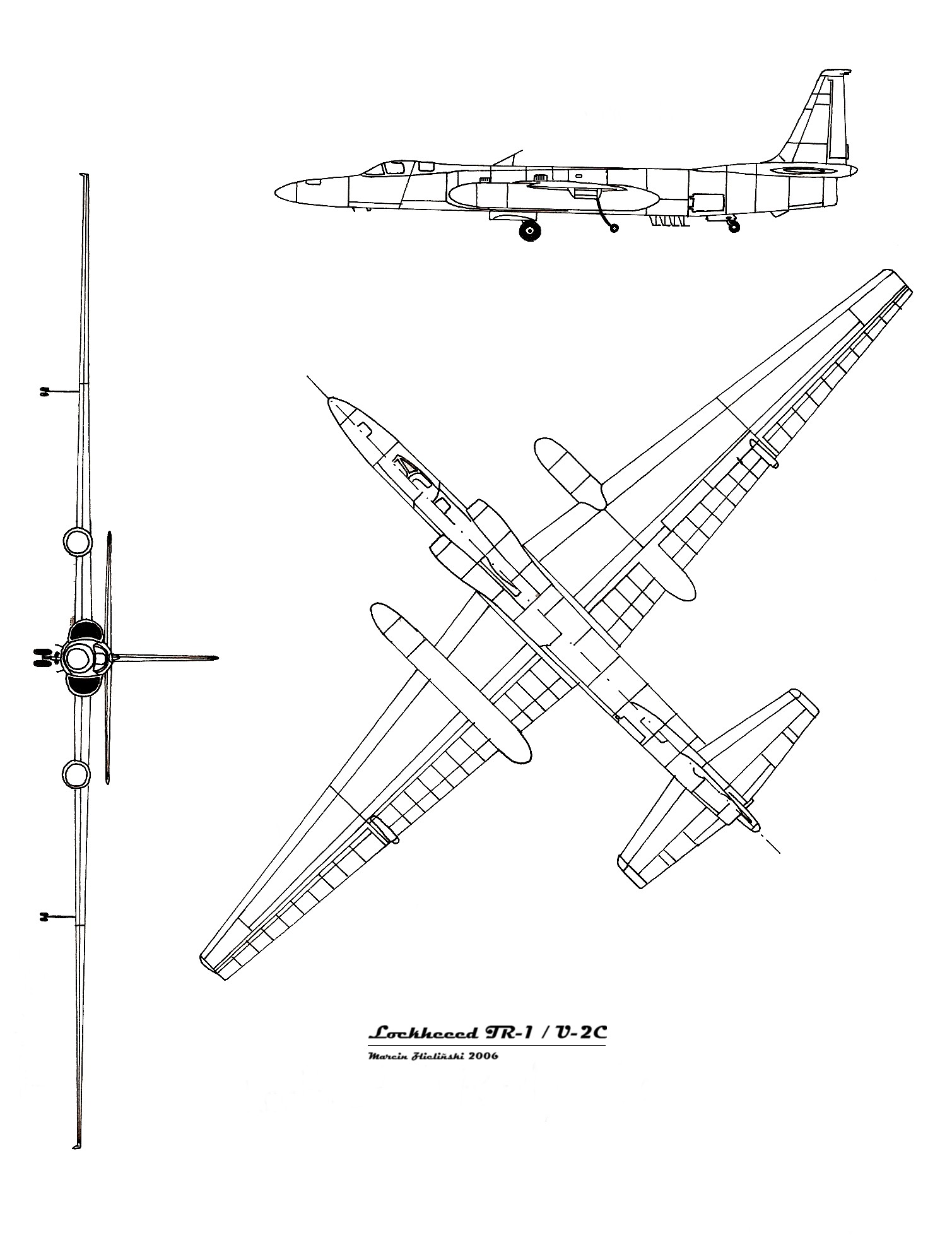
3-view line drawing of the Lockheed U-2

Data from Jane's all the World's Aircraft 1989–90, U.S. Air Force fact sheet, and Lockheed Martin U-2S product card

General characteristics

- Crew: 1
- Capacity: 5,000 lb (2,300 kg) payload
- Length: 63 ft 0 in (19.20 m)
- Wingspan: 103 ft (31 m)
- Height: 16 ft 0 in (4.88 m)
- Wing area: 1,000 sq ft (93 m^{2})
- Airfoil: root: NACA 63A409; tip: NACA 63A406
- Empty weight: 16,000 lb (7,257 kg)
- Max takeoff weight: 40,000 lb (18,144 kg)
- Fuel capacity: 2,950 US gal (2,460 imp gal; 11,200 L)
- Powerplant: 1 × General Electric F118-101 turbofan engine, 17,000 lbf (76 kN) thrust

Performance

- Cruise speed: Mach 0.715 (412 kn; 470 mph; 760 km/h) at 72,000 ft (22,000 m)
- Cruise speed: 413 kn (475 mph, 765 km/h) at 65,000 ft (20,000 m)
- Stall speed: 65 kn (75 mph, 120 km/h)
- Range: 6,090 nmi (7,010 mi, 11,280 km)
- Endurance: 12 hours
- Service ceiling: 80,000 ft (24,000 m)
- Rate of climb: 9,000 ft/min (46 m/s)
- Time to altitude: 60,000 ft (18,000 m) in 12 minutes 30 seconds
- Lift-to-drag: 25.6
- Wing loading: 40 lb/sq ft (200 kg/m^{2})
- Thrust/weight: 0.425
- Fuel consumption: 910 lb/h (410 kg/h) in cruise

== In popular culture ==
The image of a U-2 was used on the cover of the band Negativland's controversial 1991 EP titled U2.

The TV series MythBusters featured the U-2 in the "Flights of Fantasy" episode during the 2015 season. The myth tested was that the U-2 was the most difficult plane to fly. While not coming to a consensus, the myth was found to be "plausible" because, among other things, the extremely bad field of vision during landing required a chase car to follow the plane to give the pilot additional visual references on the ground.

The 1960 U-2 incident is at the center of the plot of the 2015 film Bridge of Spies, directed by Steven Spielberg and starring Tom Hanks, Mark Rylance, Amy Ryan and Alan Alda.

== See also ==
- James May at the Edge of Space
- Lockheed SR-71 Blackbird
- Measurement and signature intelligence
- USAF Captain Charles Maultsby accidentally flies a U-2 into Russian airspace during Cuban Missile Crisis

Related development

- Beriev S-13

Aircraft of comparable role, configuration, and era

- Bell X-16
- Canberra PR.9/RB-57F Canberra
- Myasishchev M-55
- Northrop N-204
- Yak-25RV

Related lists

- List of active United States military aircraft
- List of Lockheed aircraft
- List of non-carrier aircraft flown from aircraft carriers
