= Bell X-16 =

Experimental high altitude aerial reconnaissance jet aircraft

X-16
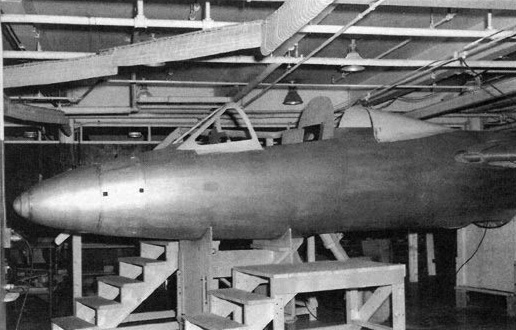
- X-16 Mock-up

General information
- Type: High altitude reconnaissance aircraft
- Manufacturer: Bell Aircraft Corporation
- Primary user: United States Air Force (intended)

The Bell X-16 was a high altitude aerial reconnaissance jet aircraft designed in the United States in the 1950s. The designation of X-16 was a cover to try to hide the true nature of the aircraft mission from the Soviet Union during the Cold War.

== Development ==
During the second half of 1953, Fairchild, Bell, and Martin Aircraft conducted high altitude reconnaissance aircraft design studies for the United States Air Force under project MX-2147. All three designs used Pratt & Whitney J57-19 turbojets. The Bell and Martin (B-57D) designs were chosen for further development. The Bell Model 67 design was designated the X-16. A full-scale mock-up was completed and one aircraft was partially completed. It was designed as a high altitude long-range reconnaissance aircraft.

The X-16 design was breaking new ground with its design. Its wingspan was long (114 ft 10 in (35.00 m)) with a high (11.9) aspect ratio. The structure was significantly lighter and more flexible than usual for jet aircraft wings. The entire aircraft was made as light as possible to achieve its intended 3,000-mile unrefueled range at 69,500 ft (21,200 m).

A total of 28 aircraft were ordered, but none were completed. The first X-16 was about 80 percent complete when the program was cancelled by the Air Force in favor of the Martin RB-57 in 1956. Although no X-16 was ever completed, it made contributions to aircraft design with its lightweight design. It was also a driving force behind the development of the high-altitude versions of the J57 that would later power the Lockheed U-2 and other aircraft.

== Specifications (X-16, as designed) ==
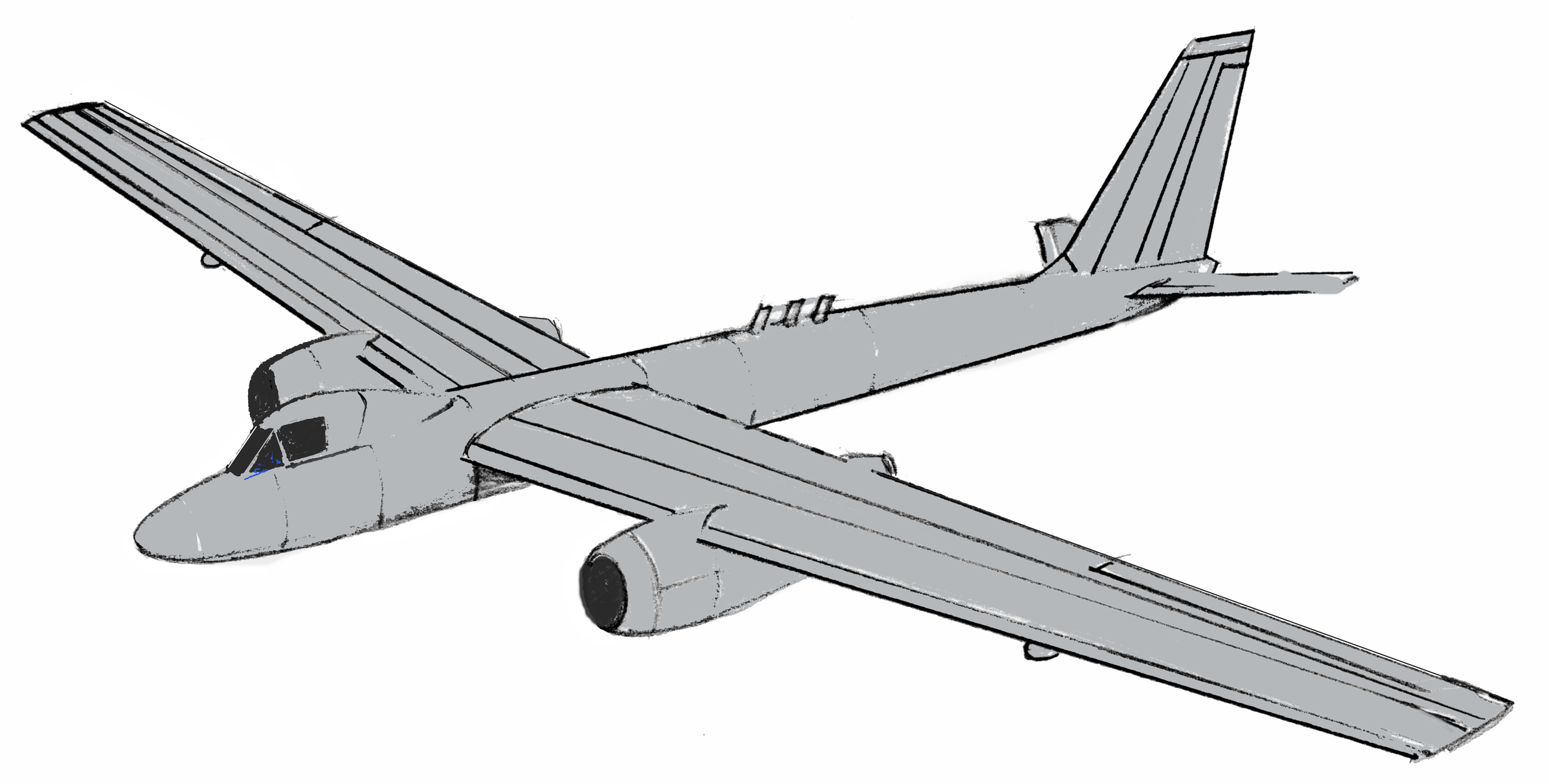
Artist's depiction

Data from

General characteristics

- Crew: one, pilot
- Length: 60 ft 10 in (18.55 m)
- Wingspan: 114 ft 10 in (35 m)
- Height: 17 ft 1 in (5.2 m)
- Wing area: 1,099 sq ft (102.19 m^{2})
- Empty weight: 23,280 lb (10,582 kg)
- Gross weight: 36,124 lb (16,420 kg)
- Powerplant: 2 × Pratt & Whitney J57-PW-37A turbojets, 10,000 lbf (44 kN) thrust each

Performance

- Maximum speed: 480 kn (553 mph, 885 km/h)
- Range: 2,867 nmi (3,319 mi, 5,310 km)
- Service ceiling: 71,832 ft (21,900 m)
- Wing loading: 33 lb/sq ft (160 kg/m^{2})
- Thrust/weight: 0.55

== See also ==
Aircraft of comparable role, configuration, and era

- Lockheed U-2
- Martin RB-57D Canberra
- Northrop N-204
- Yakovlev Yak-25RV
