= HRB =

HRB may refer to:

- HRB (gene)
- HRB Systems, an American defense contractor
- Boeing HRB-1, a helicopter
- Croatian Revolutionary Brotherhood (Croatian: Hrvatsko revolucionarno bratstvo)
- FBI Human Resources Branch, US
- H&R Block, NYSE symbol
- Harbin Taiping International Airport, Heilongjiang, China
- Health Research Board, Ireland
- House of Responsibility, in Hitler's birth house, Braunau am Inn, Germany
- HRB, a Rockwell scale of materials' hardness
