= Martin/General Dynamics RB-57F Canberra =

High-altitude strategic reconnaissance aircraft developed from Martin RB-57D Canberra

RB-57F Canberra
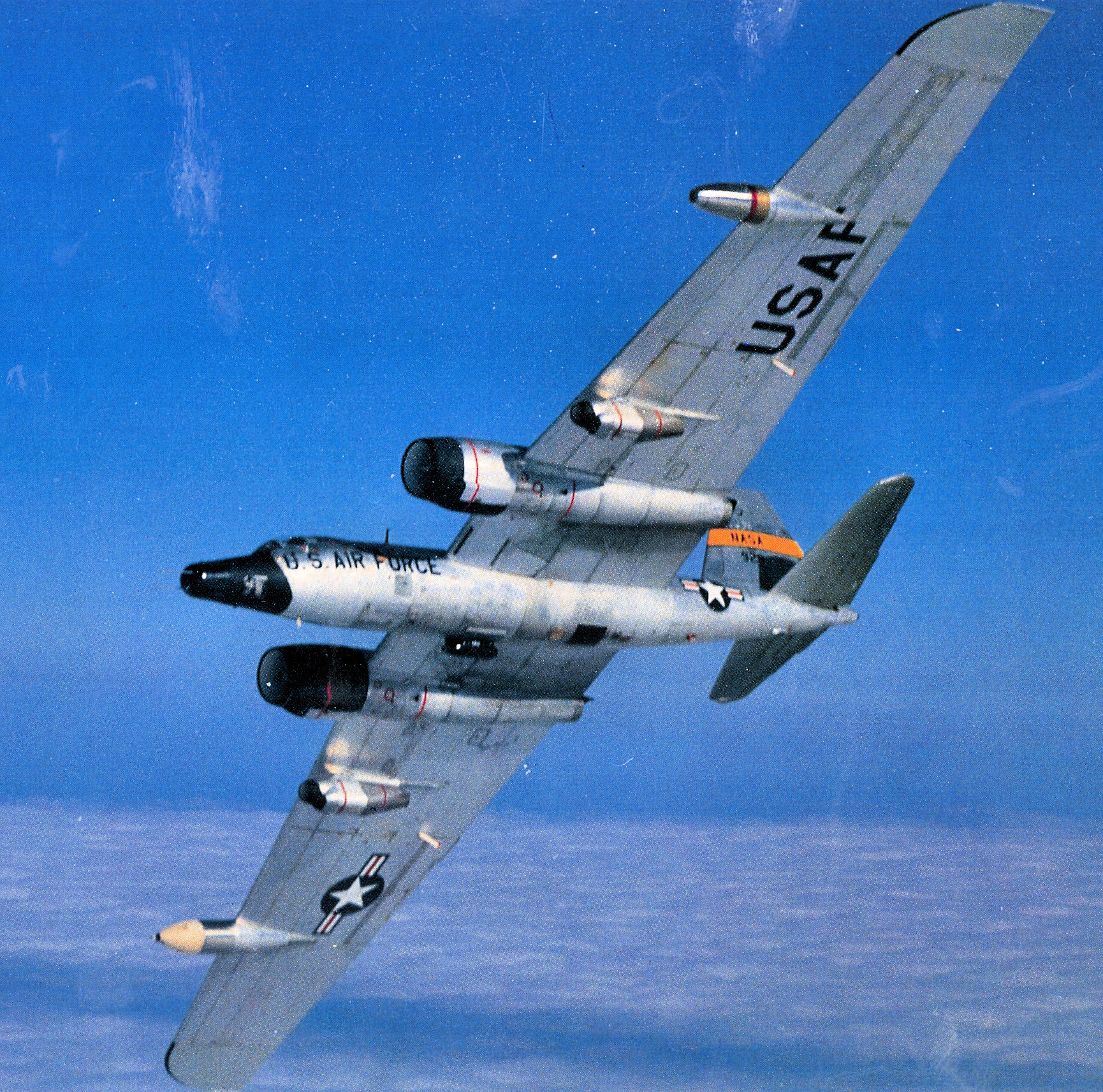
- Martin/General Dynamics RB-57F October 1978 (NASA 928)

General information
- Type: Reconnaissance
- Manufacturer: Martin; Re-manufactured by General Dynamics
- Status: 3 still used by NASA as of 2026
- Primary users: United States Air Force Pakistan Air Force; NASA
- Number built: 21

History
- Introduction date: 1963
- First flight: 23 June 1963
- Retired: 1974 (USAF)
- Developed from: Martin B-57 Canberra

The Martin/General Dynamics RB-57F Canberra is a specialized strategic reconnaissance aircraft developed in the 1960s for the United States Air Force by General Dynamics from the Martin B-57 Canberra tactical bomber, which, in turn, was a license-built version of the English Electric Canberra. It was operationally assigned to the Air Weather Service for weather reconnaissance involving high-altitude atmospheric sampling and radiation detection in support of nuclear test monitoring, but four of the 21 modified aircraft performed solely as strategic reconnaissance platforms in Japan and Germany.

Three of the modified aircraft were destroyed with the loss of their crews while performing operationally. The remainder were re-designated WB-57F in 1968. Four of the survivors were subsequently used by NASA for high-altitude atmospheric research. The others were retired from 1972 to 1974 and placed in storage.

As of 2024, three WB-57Fs are the only B-57 aircraft model still flying, in service with NASA.

== Design and development ==
The RB-57F was the result of an Air Force Big Safari requirement for a high-altitude reconnaissance platform with better performance than the existing and similar RB-57D, some of which had been grounded as a result of wing spar failures. A more urgent need to field an aircraft capable of high altitude signals intelligence arose in 1962 when a SIGINT operation conducted by United States Navy against the Soviet Union from Peshawar, Pakistan, ended abruptly because the Pakistani government evicted the Navy for committing too many violations of restricted airspace. Two B-57Bs dubbed "Pee Wee 1" and "Pee Wee 2" were quickly modified by Big Safari with antennas and a modular telemetry receiver suite packaged in a pressurized canister (Note: Each of these modifications was a separate Big Safari program. Both aircraft later became RB-57Fs under the followup First Chip program.) and sent to Pakistan in January 1963 as an interim measure under an operation named Little Cloud to continue the mission. In the meantime, Big Safari authorized the Pee Wee III project to develop the new high-altitude platform from existing B-57s. Because General Dynamics was responsible for contract maintenance on the D model, its Fort Worth Division (Note: Big Safari also maintained a liaison office here that later became the program's Detachment 1. The office closed in 1972 but re-opened as an off-site operating location (OL) of Big Safari Detachment 2 in 1974.) was given the sole-source contract for the development of the Pee Wee III RB-57F prototypes.

The two aircraft chosen for initial development were Martin B-57Bs 52-1559 and 53-3864, which supplied the fuselage and horizontal stabilizers around which the rebuild was made. The prototype RB-57Fs incorporated many major changes from the RB-57D, the most obvious of which was an enlarged computer-designed wing to enable it to operate at extreme altitudes. The wing had a span of more than 122 feet (37 m), which was 16 feet (4.9 m) longer than the RB-57D and nearly twice the length of the B-57B fuselage on which it was installed. Extensive use was made of aluminum honeycomb wing panels in the wings that bonded outer and inner aluminum skins to a honeycomb of aluminum and fiberglass. (Note: The panel design had originally been developed for the Convair B-58 Hustler.) All control surfaces had tightly sealed gaps in order to reduce drag, and there were no wing flaps. In addition, the size of the empennage was redesigned so that the vertical stabilizer had nearly twice the area of that of the standard B-57B. Its height was increased to 19 feet (5.8 m) and the width increased, improving longitudinal and asymmetric control for greater stability at very high altitudes (up to 80,000 feet (24,000 m)).

Another change was the replacement of the Wright J65 turbojets with Pratt & Whitney TF33-P-11 turbofan engines. The TF33s gave the aircraft more than double the thrust of the B model. The RB-57F was also fitted with two detachable Pratt & Whitney J60-P-9 turbojets mounted in pods attached to the wings outboard of the main engines. These auxiliary engines were air-started and only for use at altitude in flight. At altitudes above 40,000 feet (12,000 m), the J60s generated about 3,300 pounds-force (15 kN) of thrust each and increased the maximum altitude of the RB-57F by 2,000–3,000 feet (610–910 m).

To perform their Pakistani mission, the two prototypes were equipped with high-gain phased array antennas in their wingtips, an extended radome, and a canister package developed by HRB-Singer known as "System 365" installed in the bomb bay. The size of two 55-US-gallon (210 L) drums, System 365 was a semi-automatic signal collection system that used 12 continuously scanning receivers and had a manual fixed-frequency coverage capability with pre-selected frequencies. The system automatically recorded up to six hours of collected signals on tape.

The extensive modifications of Pee Wee III resulted in virtually a new aircraft and new serial numbers for fiscal year 1963 were assigned to the 21 modified aircraft. (Note: AF s/n 63-13286 to 63-13302 for the Rivet Chips, and 63-13500 to 63-13503 for the Rivet Slices.)

=== Testing and production ===
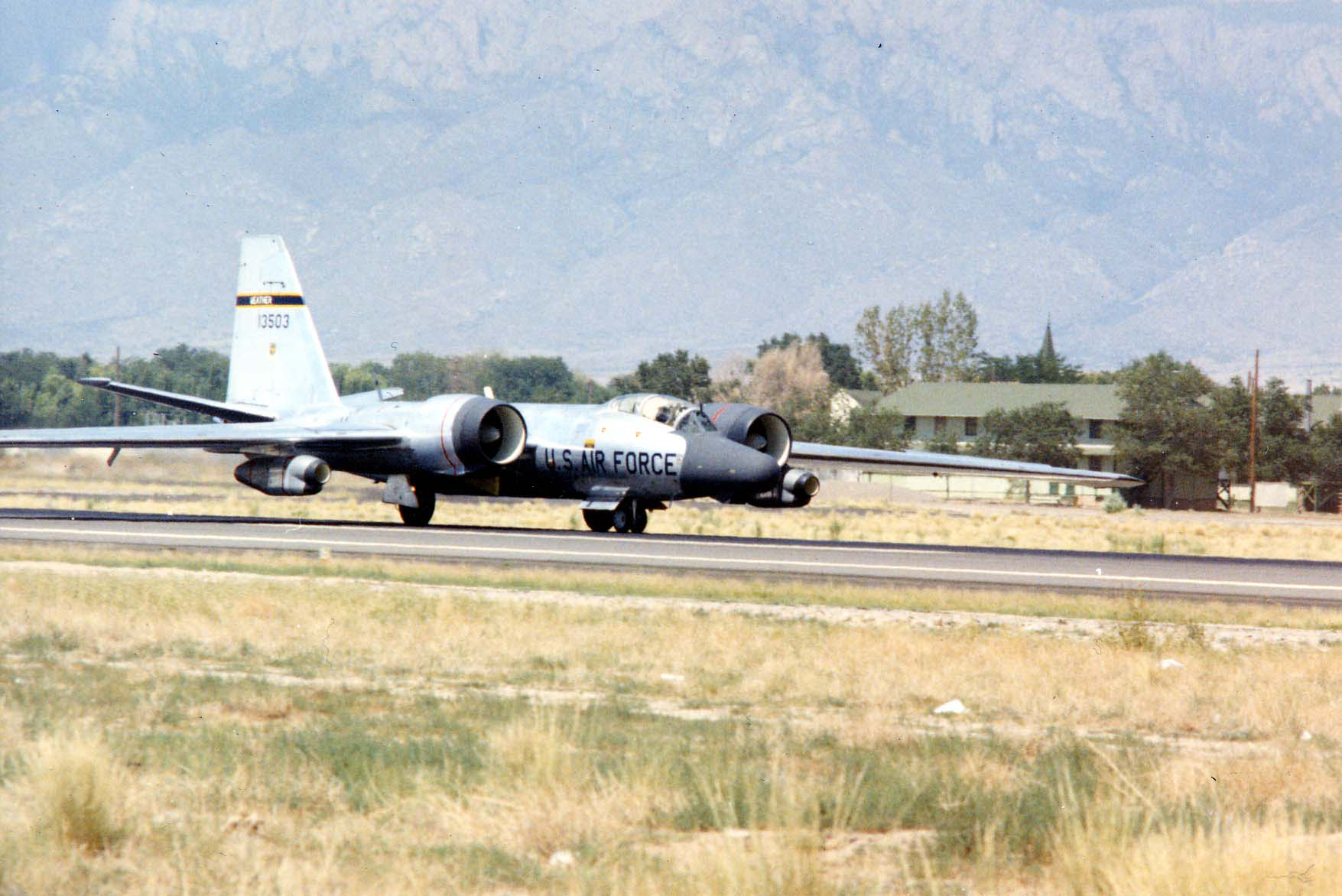
WB-57F Canberra 63-13503 Rivet Slice conversion taxiing at Kirtland. Now flying as NASA 926.

The first test flight of the RB-57F prototype was conducted on 23 June 1963 at Edwards Air Force Base, California. The prototype showed the aircraft reaching 50,000 feet (15,000 m) in 18 minutes with a steady rate of climb of 2,725 f/min (831 m/min). Its RB-57D chase plane was unable to match it in maneuverability. The wing design created tremendous lift even at idle speeds; the aircraft was airborne after a takeoff roll of only 2,600 feet (790 m) at sea level. Because of this it also proved difficult to land, and if an engine failed during takeoff, TF33 main engine thrust was limited to 70% power to maintain directional control. Despite some shortcomings the design had shown exceptional performance and Big Safari authorized the First Chip production program in August 1963 for the fabrication of 19 more RB-57Fs from existing B-57 airframes.

After its flight test program, the two RB-57F prototypes were sent to Rhein-Main AB, West Germany in late 1963 for operational testing and evaluation (OT&E) with the 7407th Support Squadron, where they proved their effectiveness in flights along the German border at over 60,000 feet (18,000 m), taking long-range photographs over the border into East Germany. They also flew reconnaissance missions over the Baltic Sea. They returned to the United States in February 1964 and were assigned to the 58th Weather Reconnaissance Squadron at Kirtland Air Force Base, New Mexico. High altitude flights required the wearing of David Clark Company A/P22S-2 and later A/P22S-4 full pressure suits, (Note: The A/P22S-2 was developed in 1960 for the North American X-15 program and required five minutes to don properly (compared to 30 for its MC-2 predecessor). It was a three-piece ensemble consisting of helmet, coveralls and removable gloves. The A/P22S-4 was an upgrade placed into service in 1967 to supplement the A/P22S-2 and provided even greater mobility in the cockpit. Each came in eight standard sizes. In 1975 the A/P22S-6, providing 12 sizes, a heated visor and a feeding/drinking capability, replaced both earlier models. NASA pilots now wear it or the A/P22S-6A with a urine collection device.) and crew pre-flight preparations were similar to those used by U-2 and SR-71 crews. (Note: The main preparation requirements were no ingestion of medications for eight hours prior to flight, a high protein/low residue meal (typically steak and eggs), a thorough flight physical, and air-conditioned transportation to the aircraft.)

The initial run of 12 aircraft for the First Chip program were converted from the 1952/1953 serial blocks of B-57B aircraft still on active duty, including the two sent to Pakistan as "Pee Wee 1" and "Pee Wee 2". They were delivered one a month through 1964; the last (First Chip 12 and formerly "Pee Wee 2") was retained as a test bed in Fort Worth. The next four conversions were to RB-57Ds that were taken out of storage under a follow-up program called Second Slice, delivered between April 1965 and February 1966. The final three were converted from RB-57A aircraft and delivered in March 1967. The converted RB-57As differed from earlier First Chip conversions by the addition of a Mk III Impact Probe in the bomb bay. In March 1968 the 63-13286 prototype was also upgraded to the First Chip standard and the two phases renamed in accordance with newly established Big Safari nomenclature that required two-word code names beginning with "Rivet." The First Chip aircraft were renamed Rivet Chip and the Second Slice as Rivet Slice.

The production aircraft were further modified with new TF33-P-11A engines that delivered even greater thrust than those of the prototypes. Foil systems developed in 1962 for the WC-130B to collect particulate debris from nuclear tests were installed in the bomb bay and the fuselage beside the cockpit. The wings had four hard points on which to mount the J60 engines and air particulate sampling pods, a gaseous sampling system was housed in the fuselage, and a KA-56 downward-looking panoramic camera mounted in the nose. Two aircraft (Note: These were Second Slice/Rivet Slice 2 and 3, converted from single-seat RB-57Ds. Rivet Slice 2 (63-13503) originally flight-tested the new camera prior to its conversion to an RB-57F, under Project Paper Doll between February 1961 and June 1962, when it was grounded for fatigue cracks in the front wing spar.) were additionally modified to carry the Bulova 707-1000 long range camera, which had a 240-inch (6096mm) focal length that resulted in its reference designation of Big Item. These high-altitude side-looking cameras, secured by a roll-stabilized mount, could take oblique shots at 5 to 15 degrees below the horizon up to 60 nautical miles (110 km) range from the aircraft and provide 30-inch (76 cm) high resolution images. The electronics were also updated on the standard F model. The nose of the aircraft was lengthened to house sophisticated navigational equipment along with sensitive detection equipment for gathering SIGINT/ELINT intelligence. The cockpit was provided with a modified Lear MC-1 autopilot. The average cost of each RB-57F conversion approximated $1.5 million. (Note: Approximately $11,000,000 per conversion in 2015 dollars using 1966 as a baseline. (U.S. Inflation Calculator))

== Operational history ==
=== Weather reconnaissance ===
The official mission of the RB-57F was weather reconnaissance, and all RB-57Fs were assigned to meteorological units of the 9th Weather Reconnaissance Wing, Air Weather Service, Military Air Transport Service (MATS), headquartered at McClellan Air Force Base, California:

- 55th Weather Reconnaissance Squadron, McClellan AFB, California
- 56th Weather Reconnaissance Squadron, Yokota AB, Japan
- 57th Weather Reconnaissance Squadron, Avalon Airport, Avalon, Victoria, Australia
- 58th Weather Reconnaissance Squadron, Kirtland AFB, New Mexico.

Air Weather Service RB-57Fs duties involved high-altitude atmospheric sampling and radiation detection work in support of nuclear test monitoring, mostly on behalf of the Atomic Energy Commission, including collection of airborne debris in a program of ongoing monitoring of nuclear tests. Most of this activity was centered on nuclear tests carried out in People's Republic of China, but monitoring air in the aftermath of U.S. underground nuclear tests was also conducted. One RB-57F is known to have been used for research into airborne laser equipment by the Air Force Logistics Command research laboratory at Kirtland AFB. In 1968, the Air Weather Service's RB-57Fs were redesignated WB-57F.

=== Strategic reconnaissance ===
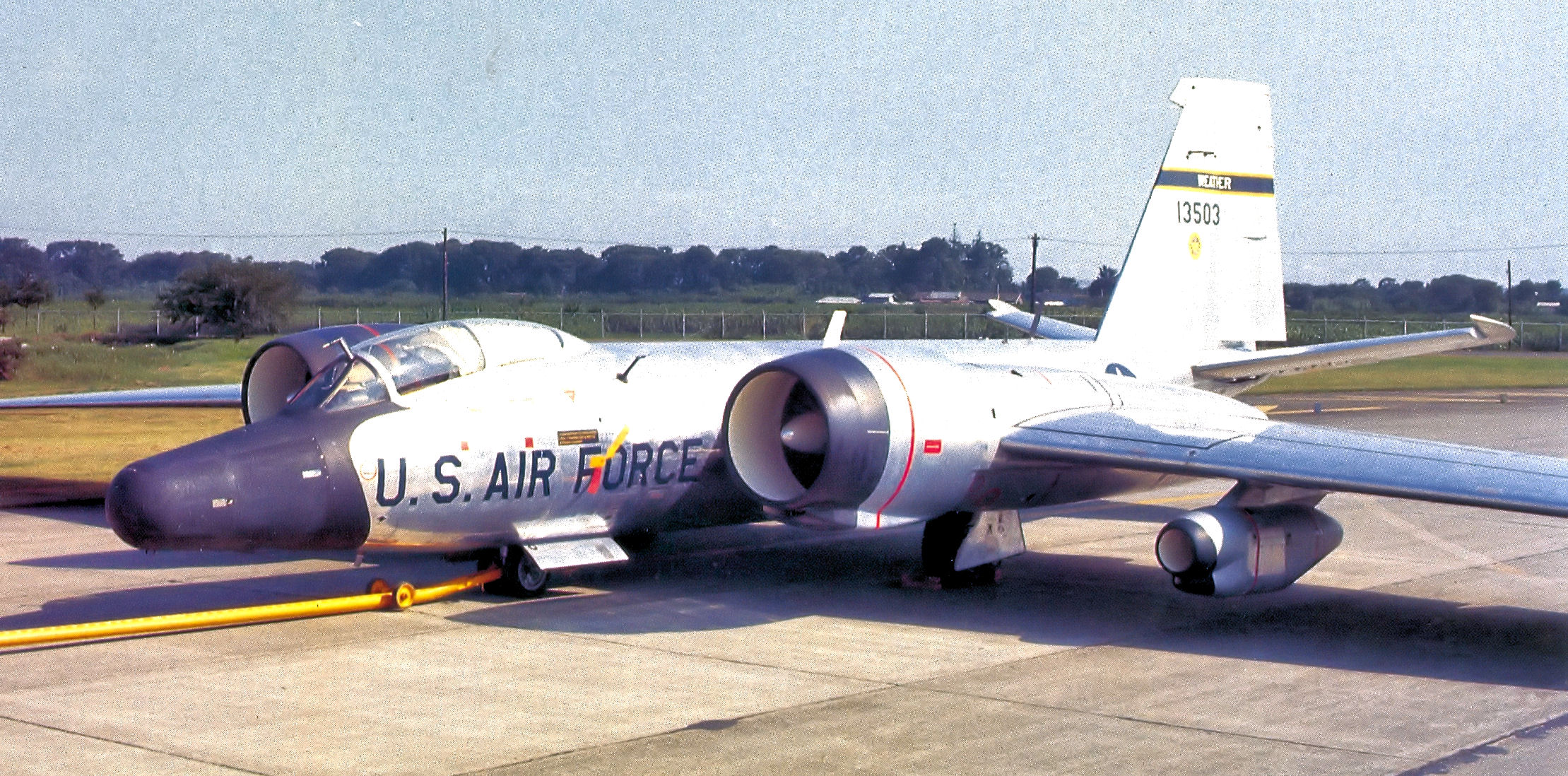
WB-57F 63-13503 assigned to 6091st Reconnaissance Squadron, Yokota AB, Japan.

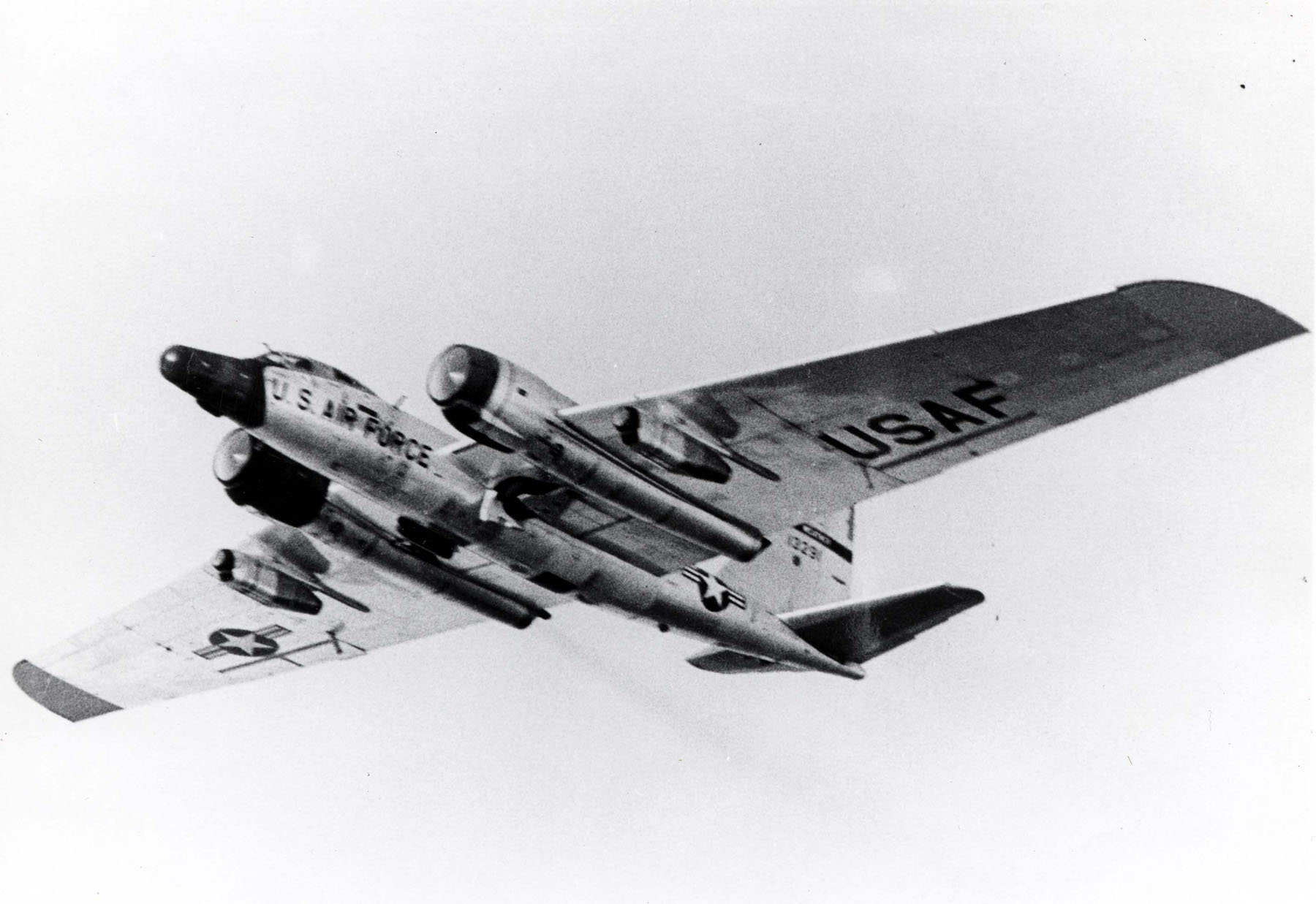
An RB-57F assigned to the 7407th Combat Support Squadron, Rhein-Main AB, West Germany.

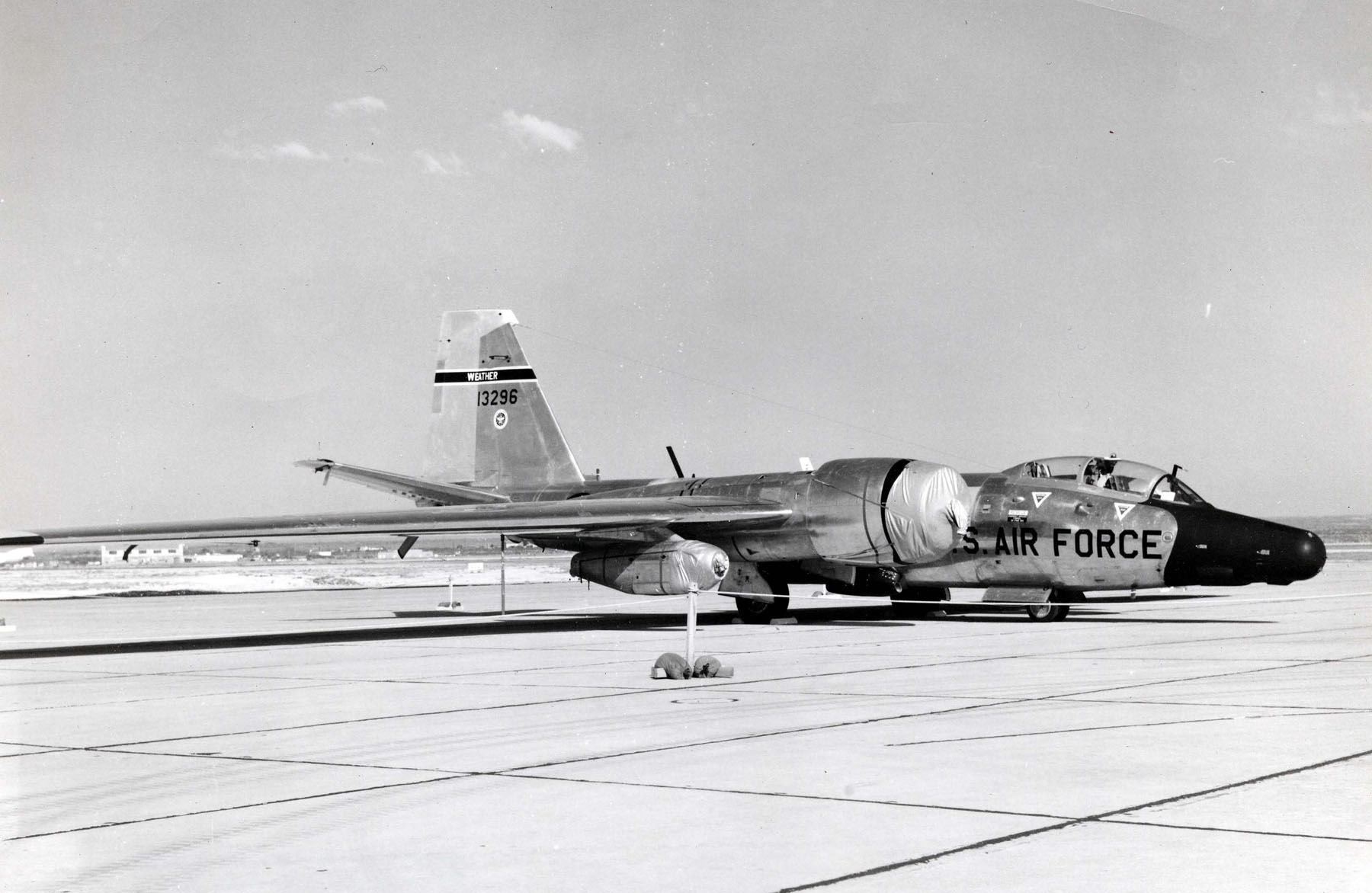
RB-57F Rivet Chip 63-13296 of the 58th Weather Reconnaissance Squadron at Webb AFB, Texas on 8 March 1965.

MATS (and its successor organization Military Airlift Command) was frequently used by the USAF for clandestine, special operations missions prior to the establishment of Air Force Special Operations Command in the 1980s. The RB-57F, with its extreme high-altitude ceiling was frequently used as a strategic reconnaissance platform. The four Rivet Slice aircraft (converted from RB-57D airframes) were equipped with covertly mounted cameras and assigned specifically to reconnaissance work in 1965, Rivet Slice 2 and 3 with the 6091st Reconnaissance Squadron at Yokota AB (Note: The Yokota aircraft conducted bomb damage assessment in North Vietnam using a route between Hanoi and Haiphong coded Upstairs Maid. From 1968 to 1972, after the 6091st RS was inactivated, they were assigned to the 556th Reconnaissance Squadron at Yokota.) and Rivet Slice 1 and 4 with the 7407th Support Squadron at Rhein-Main AB. (Note: The 7407th CCS had been operating six RB-57Ds since 1959.)

The RB-57F prototypes (63-13286 and 63-13287) developed under the Pee Wee III program were detached from the 58th WRS after operational testing and evaluation and sent to Pakistan to replace "Pee Wee 1" and "Pee Wee 2" in Little Cloud. The Indo-Pakistani War of 1965 began while Pee Wee III aircraft No. 2 was out of the country and No. 1 was operated by 24 Squadron of the Pakistan Air Force. (Note: 24 Squadron was created as an electronic warfare unit for the Rivet Flash RB-57B and based at PAF Base Mauripur near Karachi.) Older accounts of the Little Cloud operation give the original reason for the RB-57F deployment to Pakistan as being the monitoring of Communist Chinese nuclear tests, which began in October 1964. The aircraft were said to have been flown by USAF crews during these operations, and one of the RB-57Fs was reported to have returned to its U.S. base before the outbreak of hostilities with India while the other remained.

Because the PAF was outnumbered by its Indian counterpart, and with U.S. concurrence, the RB-57F was reportedly impressed into combat service with PAF's No 24 Squadron to carry out daily reconnaissance sorties over Indian Air Force airfields at altitudes of up to 60,000 feet (18,000 m). The RB-57F was also said to have been locally modified by the PAF to carry a 4,000 pounds (1,800 kg) bombload, but never actually operated in a bombing role. On other occasions, the RB-57F was accompanied by a pair of PAF B-57B Canberra bombers (apparently the Rivet Flash configurations sold to Pakistan in 1959 as standard B-57s but modified in 1964 under a pre-agreement of sale to enable them to track Indian mobile radars) that were jamming Indian military radio transmissions.

All three aircraft were involved in directing attacks on an Indian radar station at Amritsar, and during these operations, one of the PAF B-57Bs was shot down in error by Pakistani anti-aircraft artillery. The account goes on to state that on 15 September 1965, RB-57F 63-13286 was straddled by two SA-2 SAMs as it commenced its descent towards Peshawar. Despite the plane's suffering major structural damage and sustaining over 170 holes, the pilot managed to nurse the aircraft back to Peshawar, where he made a successful forced landing. The aircraft was eventually repaired and returned to the USAF.

However, in a newer history by a retired Big Safari commander published in 2014, some of the earlier account is refuted as erroneous. The Pee Wee III aircraft arrived in Pakistan in March 1964, well before the Chinese nuclear tests began, not for monitoring the tests since the aircraft were not yet equipped with the sampling equipment, camera, or sensors of the standard RB-57Fs, but to collect telemetry from Soviet missile test ranges, particularly Kapustin Yar. The aircraft were both flown and maintained by members of the Pakistan Air Force, not the U.S. Air Force, a condition mandated by the Pakistanis. The RB-57F prototypes, with the required capability of being a type that PAF airmen could fly, had been purpose-built with the telemetry mission as its goal, and the modification for carrying a two-ton payload in the bomb bay had been made by General Dynamics as part of its development, not by the PAF. From April to October 1965 the two RB-57s each underwent an annual three-month depot maintenance recycle at the General Dynamics plant in Fort Worth required by Big Safari rules, which was where Pee Wee III No. 2 was when the air war began on 1 September 1965.

One member of the USAF crew sent by the Big Safari office to retrieve the damaged RB-57 doubts that the aircraft was used in the role described as its sensors were tailored specifically for the telemetry mission and of no value in combat, and that it operated in an area away from Indian airspace. Peshawar is located 70 miles (110 km) from the closest international frontier with India and was almost 100 miles (160 km) from the nearest battle front, making damage from a SAM highly unlikely. The damage itself was largely superficial, not structural. Instead he states that he was told that the aircraft was damaged during an IAF air raid on its airfield on 7 September. It had been kept in the air as much as possible to protect it from attack but was damaged during a refueling turnaround. The damaged aircraft was returned to the United States to protect it from further harm and to process the sensitive collected data, which the Pakistanis did not have the capability of doing. Both aircraft were reassigned to the 7407th Support Squadron when 63-13287 emerged from its depot recycle. The Rivet Flash B-57 was overflying a Pakistani radar site at Rahwali, 70 miles (110 km) from Amritsar, when it was shot down on 11 September 1965 by its own AAA, mistaken for an IAF Canberra. The death of the PAF squadron leader flying it, who was the key Pakistani member of the Little Cloud operation, precipitated the rapid exit from Pakistan of the RB-57Fs.

The newer information is supported by the fate of 63-13287. On 14 December 1965, operating TDY from Incirlik Air Base in Turkey as "Big Rib 06", it disappeared during a mission over the Black Sea whose route passed through telemetry range for Soviet ICBMs. What actually happened is still uncertain. There was speculation that the aircraft had been shot down by a Soviet S-75 Dvina (NATO designation "SA-2 Guideline") surface-to-air missile, but the official statement by the USAF was that the aircraft was on its third pass along its route when it deviated from its flight plan, orbiting and spiraling down to below minimum radar tracking altitude, indicating that the aircraft crew had probably perished from an oxygen system failure. Although searches for the wreckage continued until 28 December, only small bits and pieces of it were recovered, although unsubstantiated reports asserted that the two crew members had been captured alive by the Soviets. However one of the recovered pieces was an inner wing panel that a team of structural experts concluded was struck by an object, likely a missile. The crew was declared dead after being missing for six months. The Soviets used the incident to argue successfully against U.S. intelligence-gathering missions originating from Turkish air bases.

=== U.S. Air Force retirement ===
Single- and double-engine engine flameouts plagued the program between June 1965 and July 1967, when fuel control problems were finally corrected. No aircraft were destroyed but one was out of service for six months after it crash-landed in a field near Albuquerque. By May 1968 stress cracks began appearing in the wing spars and ribs of all the RB-57Fs outboard of the main engines and numerous groundings forced the cancellation of many operational missions. Some aircraft were sent to General Dynamics for repairs but under Big Safari dicta the cost of repairing all of the aircraft was excessive and resulted in five being placed in storage at Davis-Monthan AFB in 1972 and another three in 1973. The remaining aircraft were retired in 1974. Each had accumulated on average a total of 3,000 hours of airframe life. The 58th WRS, the last squadron in the Air Force to use the WB-57F, was inactivated on 1 July 1974. (Note: Air Force Chief of Staff General John D. Ryan, General Paul K. Carlton (who became commander of the Military Airlift Command in September 1972) and AWS commander Brig. Gen. William Best (a non-rated non-flyer) were very hostile to the Air Weather Service flying mission in general and the WB-57F in particular. In addition Carlton was called tyrannical in his handling of AWS and Best strongly disapproved of the "fighter pilot" ethos of the 58th WRS (which jocularly referred to itself as "F Troop"). All three pushed strenuously to have both the aircraft retired and the 58th WRS shut down.)

Three RB-57Fs were lost in operational service. Rivet Chip 10 (63-13297) crashed on 7 November 1966 when it descended below its assigned altitude while on Instrument Flight Rules during a night approach to Kirtland AFB in bad weather and struck the summit of Sandia Crest. On 27 June 1972 Rivet Chip 5 (63-13292) disintegrated when it entered a "Mach tuck" above an altitude of 50,000 feet (15,000 m) near Albuquerque. The crews of both Rivet Chips were killed. The third loss, that of the second prototype, was possibly a Cold War casualty, also with loss of crew.

=== NASA ===
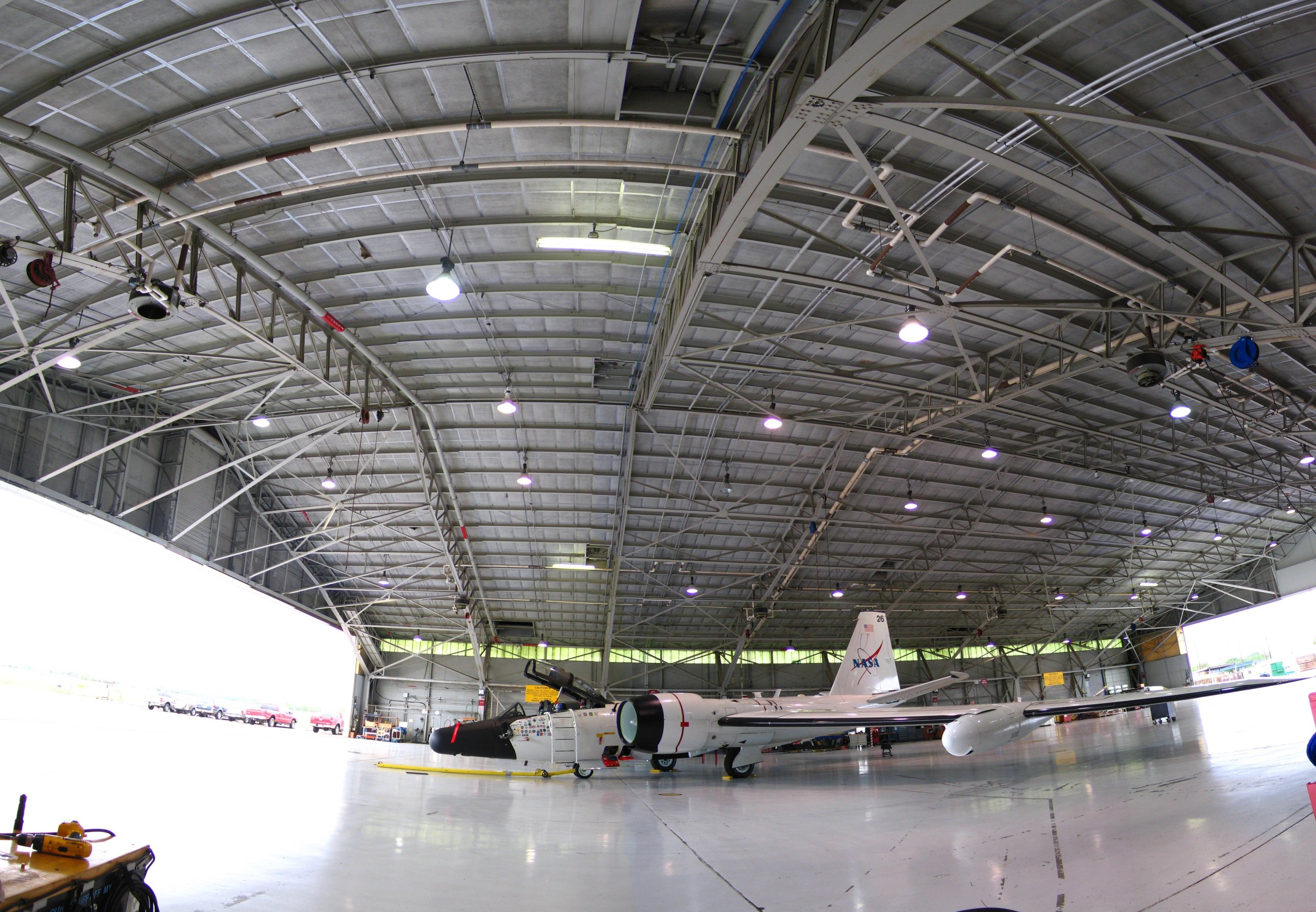
Panorama of NASA 926 inside Ellington Field's hangar 990.

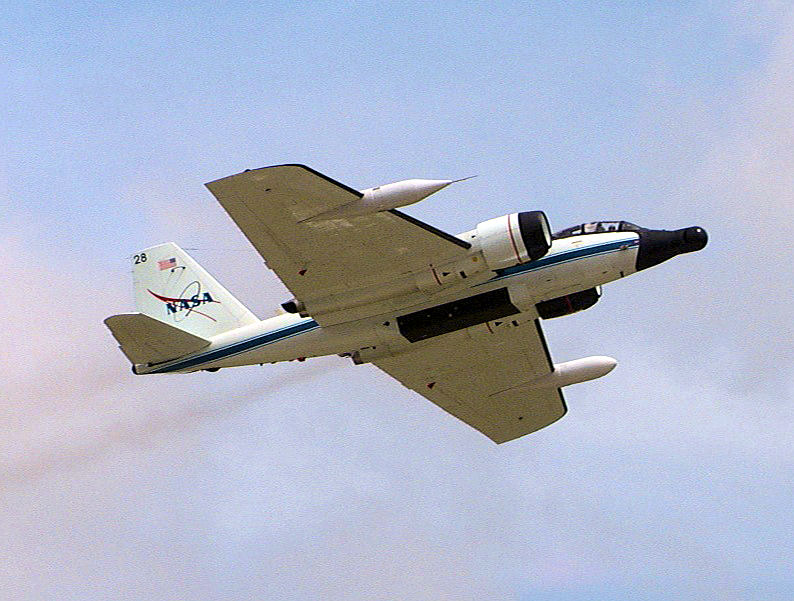
NASA 928 takes to the skies in 2005, carrying a special nose-mounted imaging system that helped NASA track and safeguard Space Shuttle Discovery during the STS-114 "return to flight" mission.

The Rivet Chip and Rivet Slice aircraft have been used by NASA in support of various research programs. NASA first provided funding to modify and operate RB-57F 63-13501 to support the Earth Resources Satellite program, with modifications taking place at Fort Worth between 26 September 1968 and 14 July 1969 as Project Rivet Rap. Flying as NASA 925 and known as "ESA (Earth Survey Aircraft) No. 3", the WB-57F was used as a flying testbed for the evaluation of multispectral sensors in a "near-space" environment to collect data to be correlated with similar data collected at low altitude and on the ground. The Air Force contracted with NASA to provide the aircraft on the condition that its sensor package be easily removed to reconfigure the aircraft quickly for its national security mission if necessary. The Rivet Rap was therefore modified to carry aerodynamically faired, plug-in pallets developed by General Dynamics to house both NASA and Air Force primary mission equipment. These pallets fit into the bomb bay and connected with existing electrical and cooling outlets and had removable operating consoles that could be fitted into the back seat station in the cockpit.

In 1972, the high cost to the Air Force of supporting the ESA No. 3 operation became prohibitive, and the aircraft was transferred permanently to NASA. Two other WB-57Fs were transferred with the inactivation of the 58th WRS (Note: NASA 926 was transferred in 1972 from aircraft designated for retirement and 928 was brought out of mothballs in 1974.) and eventually all those in NASA service were issued FAA civil registrations. They are designated the NASA High Altitude Research Project at the Johnson Space Center in Houston, Texas, and operate from Ellington Field JRB. Three of the four WB-57F aircraft used by NASA remain in operational service, conducting a variety of civil tasks worldwide:

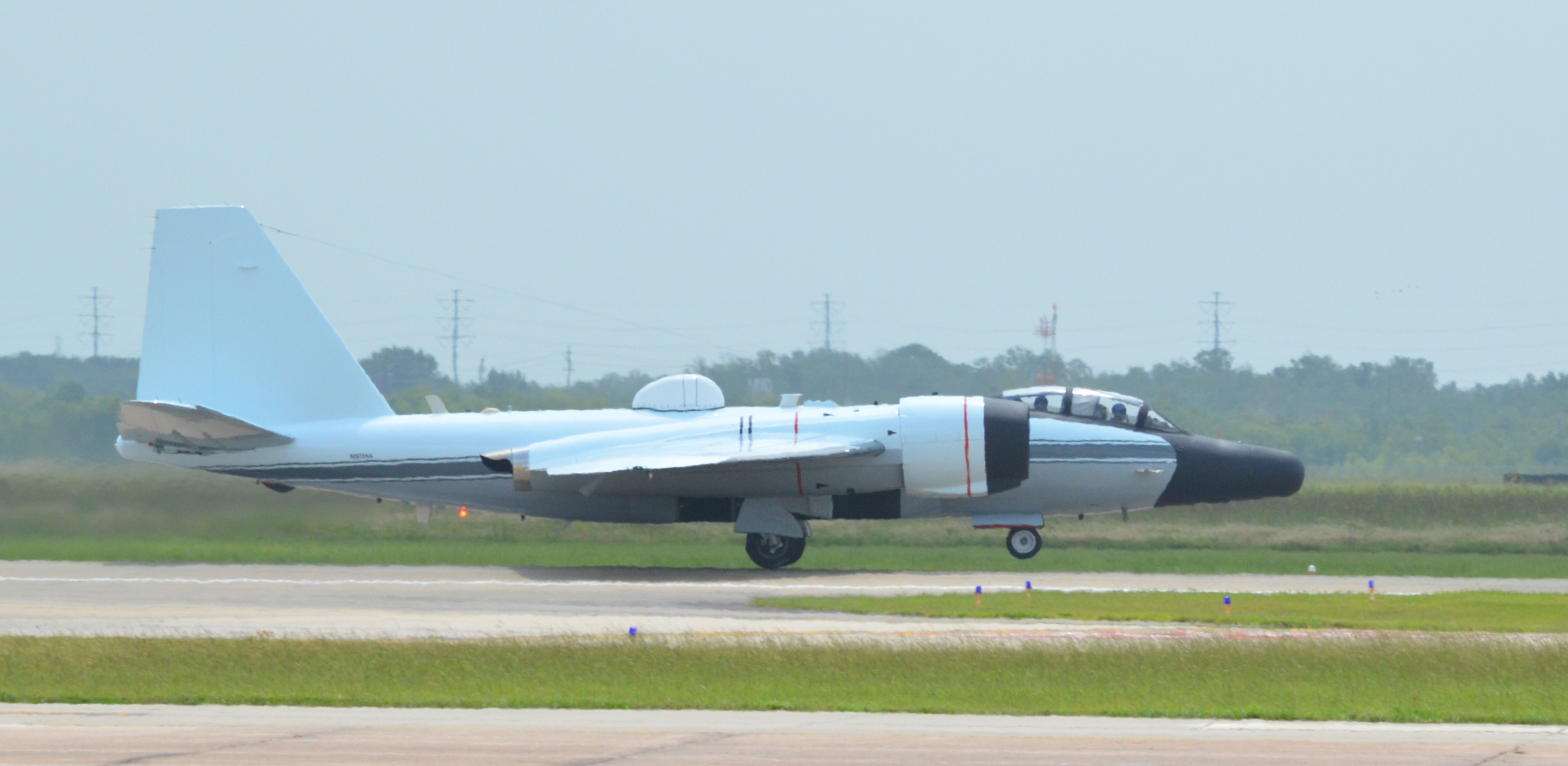
New low profile paint scheme used on NASA 928 in June 2012.

- N925NA (NASA 925), AF s/n 63-13501 (Rivet Slice 3 and Rivet Rap), retired 15 September 1982
- N926NA (NASA 926), AF s/n 63-13503 (Rivet Slice 2), registry expires 31 August 2029
- N927NA (NASA 927), AF s/n 63-13295 (Rivet Chip 8), registry expires 31 July 2029
- N928NA (NASA 928), AF s/n 63-13298 (Rivet Chip 11), registry expires 30 June 2028 (Note: NASA 928 began service life as B-57B 52-1536 and was modified in 1962 as "Pee Wee 1" before it was "Rivet Chip 11".)

For NASA operations, the aircraft often carry a three-ton (2,700 kg) data-gathering sensor pallet in the former bomb-bay underneath the center fuselage that can include the Airborne Remote Earth Sensing (ARES) instrument to calibrate satellite data, a combined hyperspectral imager/radiometer with a two-dimensional focal plane array, and a variety of cameras. During the Space Shuttle program, the aircraft were equipped with a special high-definition camera and other sensors in a specially adapted gimbal-mounted ball turret mounted in the nose, known as the WB-57F Ascent Video Experiment (WAVE) to track and video Space Shuttle launches and recoveries from high altitude.

On 10 October 2005, NASA 928 flew from Ellington Field via CFB Goose Bay, Newfoundland and Labrador to RAF Mildenhall in Suffolk, England arriving during the evening of 11 October 2005. The WB-57F then flew four missions out of Mildenhall at up to 48,500 feet (14,800 m) in UK airspace collecting "cosmic dust". The Cosmic Dust Collector (CDC) mission uses two small metallic rectangular boxes carried under each wing that are designed to open at altitude and collect "interplanetary dust particles", or in other words the remains of small meteorites or rocks from space that accumulate in the upper atmosphere, on an adhesive strip. At the end of the assigned track the boxes then automatically close at high altitude and after landing the adhesive strip is removed and returned to the U.S. for analysis. The missions also allowed the WB-57F crews to validate new radios and avionics and ensure these could interface correctly with European ATC agencies. There was also an unconfirmed report that the aircraft also supported a UK MoD assessment of future sensors for UAV applications in a European environment by carrying the sensors in its pallet under the fuselage.

In August 2006, NASA 928 arrived at RAF Mildenhall totally devoid of all the usual identification marks, particularly serial numbers or NASA logos. The only insignia were a small U.S. flag on the tail fin and some even smaller flags beneath the cockpit on the port side. The lack of insignia possibly indicated that the aircraft was operating on behalf of another U.S. government agency. After some local sorties, possibly to test the onboard equipment, the aircraft departed to Kandahar Airport, Afghanistan via NSA Souda Bay, Crete. The aircraft then flew a number of sorties out of Kandahar, presumably carrying a classified sensor package and returned to Ellington Field via Souda Bay and Mildenhall.

Officially, the aircraft performed geophysical and remote sensing surveys in 2007 for a coalition of scientists created by the Department of Defense representing the U.S. Geological Survey, the Afghanistan Ministry of Mines and Petroleum, and the Task Force for Business and Stability Operations (TFBSO), as part of the U.S. aid to the Afghan reconstruction effort. Through 28 missions, the WB-57 collected AVIRIS (Airborne Visible / InfraRed Imaging Spectrometer) data that could be analyzed to provide information on mineral assemblages that could aid in resource and hazards assessments.

From November 2010 to August 2011, a WB-57 was deployed to Afghanistan with the High-Altitude Lidar Operational Experiment (HALOE) payload, surveying over 70,000 km^{2} (27,000 mi^{2}), 10% of the surface of Afghanistan. An updated HALOE package has subsequently been installed in a Bombardier Global Express BD-700 business jet.

Reports surfaced in March 2011 that NASA 926 was observed performing flights from Nellis AFB testing a new sensor package being carried in its pallet system payload bay over the period from 15 November 2011 until 1 February 2012. Although the reason for the deployment to the Nevada Test and Training Range (NTTR) was unknown, it was linked to testing sensors within the NTTR. Since both NASA 926 and 928 have carried BACN (Battlefield Airborne Communications Node) payloads in Afghanistan performing network-centric warfare missions, it was speculated that the Canberra was testing new sensors and antennas used by BACN to relay communications between command and control centers and ground troops located within valleys and ridges in the Afghanistan mountains.

NASA 927 joined the fleet after being taken out of AMARG storage at Davis-Monthan AFB. The aircraft started its service life as B-57B s/n 53-3918 as a night intruder with the 8th Tactical Bomb Squadron and then was rebuilt as RB-57F 63-13295 in 1964. The aircraft was retired to the then MASDC on 26 June 1972 and remained at the AMARC or AMARG until May 2011. The aircraft was then dismantled and trucked to Sierra Nevada Corporation (SNC) at Centennial Airport, Colorado where it was refurbished to flying condition and flown to Ellington AFB on 9 August 2013. The aircraft was turned over to NASA and re-designated NASA 927. NASA 927 is now the aircraft longest held in extended storage (41 years) before being returned to flight status.

On January 27, 2026, NASA 927 was forced to perform a gear-up landing at Ellington Field Joint Reserve Base due to a mechanical issue. Both crew members onboard survived with no injuries. The WB-57F, N927NA, sustained significant damage and remains grounded as of January 2026.

Its latest use was on April 10, 2026, when N926NA was used in the surveillance network for reentry of Artemis II west of the coast of San Diego.

== Operators ==
United States

- United States Air Force
- National Aeronautics and Space Administration
- National Center for Atmospheric Research
- National Oceanic and Atmospheric Administration

Pakistan

- Pakistan Air Force
  - No. 24 Squadron "Blinders"
  - 2 RB-57F between 1964 - 1973

Taiwan

- Republic of China Air Force

== Surviving aircraft ==
Operational

WB-57F

- 63-13503 (N926NA) — National Aeronautics and Space Administration, Houston, Texas.
- 63-13295 (N927NA) — National Aeronautics and Space Administration, Houston, Texas.
- 63-13298 (N928NA) — National Aeronautics and Space Administration, Houston, Texas.

On static display

WB-57F

- 63-13501 (N925NA) — Pima Air & Space Museum adjacent to Davis-Monthan AFB in Tucson, Arizona. (unrestored)

== Specifications ==
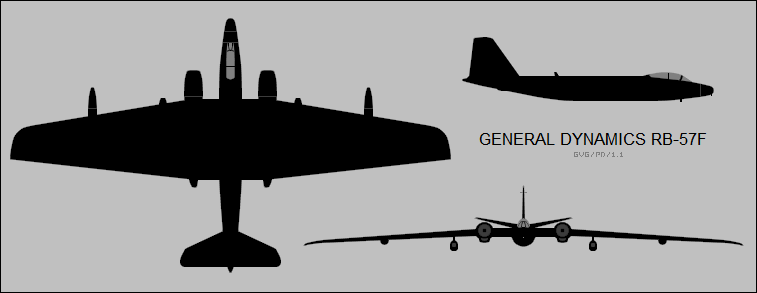

Data from WB-57 Experimenter's Handbook

General characteristics

- Crew: 2
- Capacity: 9,700 lb (4,400 kg) payload
- Length: 68 ft 3 in (20.80 m)
- Wingspan: 122 ft 6 in (37.34 m)
- Height: 20 ft 6 in (6.25 m)
- Wing area: 2,000 sq ft (190 m^{2})
- Gross weight: 72,000 lb (32,659 kg)
- Powerplant: 2 × Pratt & Whitney TF33-P-11A turbofans, 15,500 lbf (69 kN) thrust each

Performance

- Maximum speed: 470 mph (760 km/h, 410 kn)
- Maximum speed: Mach 0.78
- Range: 2,900 mi (4,600 km, 2,500 nmi)
- Endurance: 6.5 h
- Service ceiling: 60,000 ft (18,000 m) (at least)
- Rate of climb: 6,000 ft/min (30 m/s)

== See also ==
Related development

- English Electric Canberra
- Martin B-57 Canberra
- Martin RB-57D Canberra

Related lists

- List of United States Air Force reconnaissance aircraft
