= No. 24 Squadron PAF =

No. 24 Squadron Blinders
- Logo of the squadron
- Active: 1962–1966; 1986–present
- Disbanded: 1966–1986
- Country: Pakistan
- Allegiance: Pakistan Armed Forces
- Branch: Pakistan Air Force
- Type: Special mission unit
- Role: Electronic warfare
- Part of: Central Air Command
- Airbase: PAF Base Mushaf
- Nickname: Blinders
- Mottos: نگاہ مسلماں کو تلوار کر دے (Urdu for 'Turning the gaze of the Muslim into a sword'); First to fly in, last to fly out.
- Aircraft: Dassault Falcon 20
- Engagements: 1965 Indo-Pakistani War; Operation Swift Retort

Commanders
- Notable commanders: Sqn Ldr M. Iqbal; Sqn Ldr Rashid Mir

Aircraft flown
- Electronic warfare: RB-57F Canberra; Dassault Falcon 20F
- Reconnaissance: RB-57B Canberra

The No. 24 Electronic Warfare Squadron, nicknamed the Blinders, is an electronic warfare unit of the Pakistan Air Force equipped with DA 20EW Falcons. It is the PAF's only Electronic Warfare squadron and undertakes EW, ECM and ESM missions while also training Pilots, Air Defense controllers and engineering officers in EW environments.

== History ==
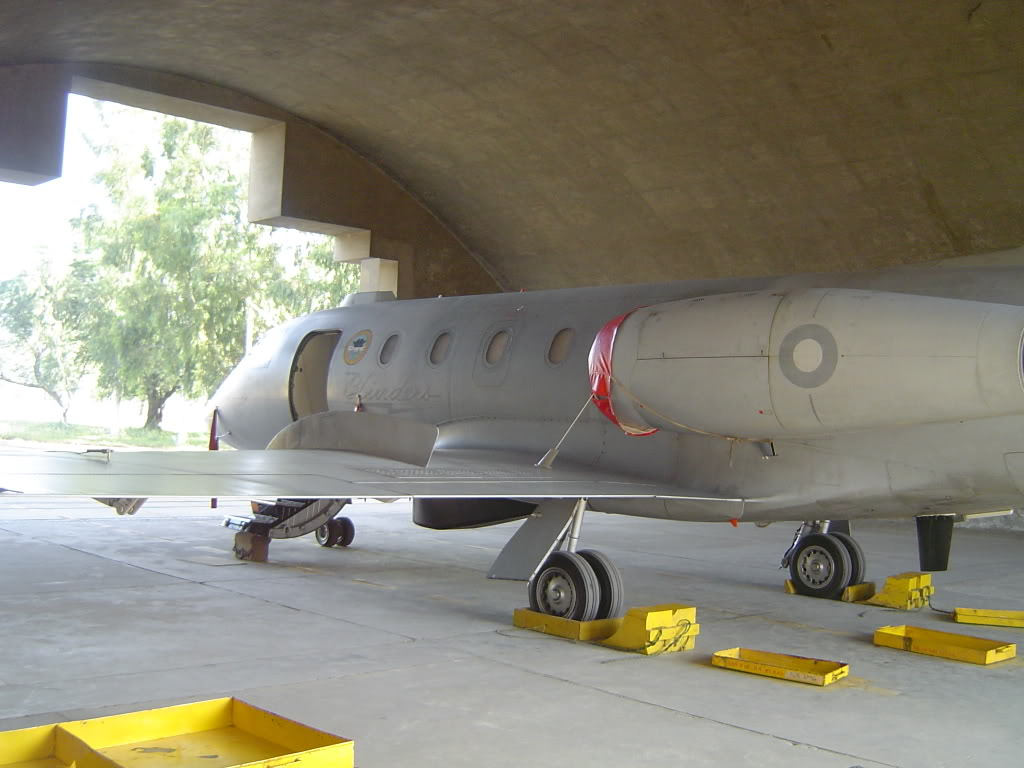
Another view of Iqbal, one of three electronic warfare aircraft in service with the squadron.

=== Formation ===
PAF Base Peshawar was an active base of operations for the USAF and US Navy to conduct ELINT missions over Soviet targets such as the Kapustin Yar missile test site. However, after the 1960 U-2 incident and repeated airspace violations by US spy planes over restricted airspaces, the Pakistani Government shut down their operations. Subsequent negotiations led to an agreement in which the same missions would be flown by Pakistan Air Force pilots, however the aircraft will be US-owned and would bear Pakistani markings. As a result, the No. 24 Squadron was raised on 5 December 1962 at Peshawar Airbase with two RB-57B Canberra spy planes (Serial No. 52-1536 and 52-1573) specially modified by the 645th Aeronautical Systems Group. A couple PAF owned B-57Bs of the No. 31 Bomber wing were fitted with an ELINT suite and 40" focal length cameras were also provided to the squadron. Its manpower consisted of both Pakistani and US aircrew. The Pakistani crew was drawn from No. 31 Bomber Wing with Squadron Leader Muhammad Iqbal serving as its first Officer Commanding.

In March 1964, the RB-57Bs were replaced with two new RB-57F ELINT spy planes which were also US owned but in Pakistani markings. They remained with the squadron till the end of the 1965 Indo-Pakistani War.

=== Disbandment ===
The 1965 Indo-Pakistani War led to postwar United States sanctions on Pakistan which affected relations between the two countries. Subsequently, the RB-57Fs of the squadron were called back to the United States and it was disbanded/number-plated in 1966.

=== Re-Establishment ===
In 1987 the Blinders were re-established and equipped with two Dassault Falcon DA-20 aircraft named Iqbal and Lodhi. They were fitted with an electronic warfare suite, tasked with providing ESM and ECM support to other PAF squadrons.

In various exercises the squadron's aircraft have provided Airborne Early Warning of intruding aircraft to participating squadrons, as well as communications jamming, radar jamming, and radar spoofing. They have been used to expose PAF aircrews to operating under degraded environments and train pilots and controllers in ECM. Lectures have been delivered on the capabilities of their DA-20 electronic warfare variant. The squadron's aircraft have been involved in almost all PAF air defence exercises, as well as various joint Army and Navy exercises. Susceptibility of army and navy systems to electronic warfare has been analysed during these exercises.

During the international exercises Inspired Alert 94, Inspired Alert 95, and Sea Spark 95, the squadron's electronic support measures equipment has been employed to gain intelligence on radar capabilities and tactics used by aircraft of participating countries. As well as international exercises, the squadron flies extensively during Indian military exercises to ensure complete coverage. Aircraft of the Blinders squadron form an integral part of trans-frontier photo reconnaissance missions flown by the PAF's reconnaissance aircraft, providing protection and early warning.

An additional DA-20 named Mir was added to the squadron's fleet in 2009. Unlike the other two, it was a normal VIP transport variant.

=== Operational history ===
==== 1965 Indo-Pakistani War ====
The 1965 Indo-Pak War saw the Blinders flying several electronic support measures (ESM) missions to assist with counter-air sorties by other PAF squadrons. In one mission, Squadron Leader M. Iqbal and his navigator Squadron Leader Saifullah Khan Lodhi provided ESM for a strike against an Indian radar station at Amritsar by PAF F-86 Sabres.

After the 1965 Indo-Pak War the squadron conducted several more sorties deep into Indian territory. Soon after the war in October 1965, Squadron Leader Rashid Mir flew an RB-57B over Agra, while being monitored by another B-57 from a large distance. The Indian Air Force attempted to engage Sqn Ldr Mir's aircraft over Agra with SA-2 Guideline surface-to-air missile but the missile exploded on launch. Another attempt was made to intercept Sqn Ldr Mir by Indian MiG-21s over the area of Pathankot/Amritsar. The aircraft was again attacked by an SA-2 Guideline missile over Ambala and this time the shockwave of the missile's warhead was reported by Sqn Ldr Mir to have buffeted the aircraft, caused an engine to flame-out and shattered the windshield with a fragment of debris. The aircraft began losing height and Indian MiG-21s again attempted to intercept, but Sqn Ldr Mir managed to reach Pakistani airspace and the Indian interceptors stopped pursuing him upon them detecting PAF F-104 Starfighters. The damaged aircraft was landed by Mir, though severely damaged.

The only aircraft left was destroyed in its hangar during a night bombing raid by IAF on 6 December in the 1971 war.

==== Operation Swift Retort ====
On 27 February 2019, the Pakistan Air Force launched retaliatory airstrikes on four Indian military installations in Indian administered Kashmir. IAF scrambled 2 MIG-21's to intercept the Pakistani strike fighters in Naushera, however, DA-20s of the 24 Squadron which had been flying since the commencement of the operation, allegedly jammed one of the Mig's communications with ground control, as per claimed by PAF. In the dogfight which ensued, an Indian Mig-21 Bison, was shot down by PAF fighters.

== Aircraft Operated ==
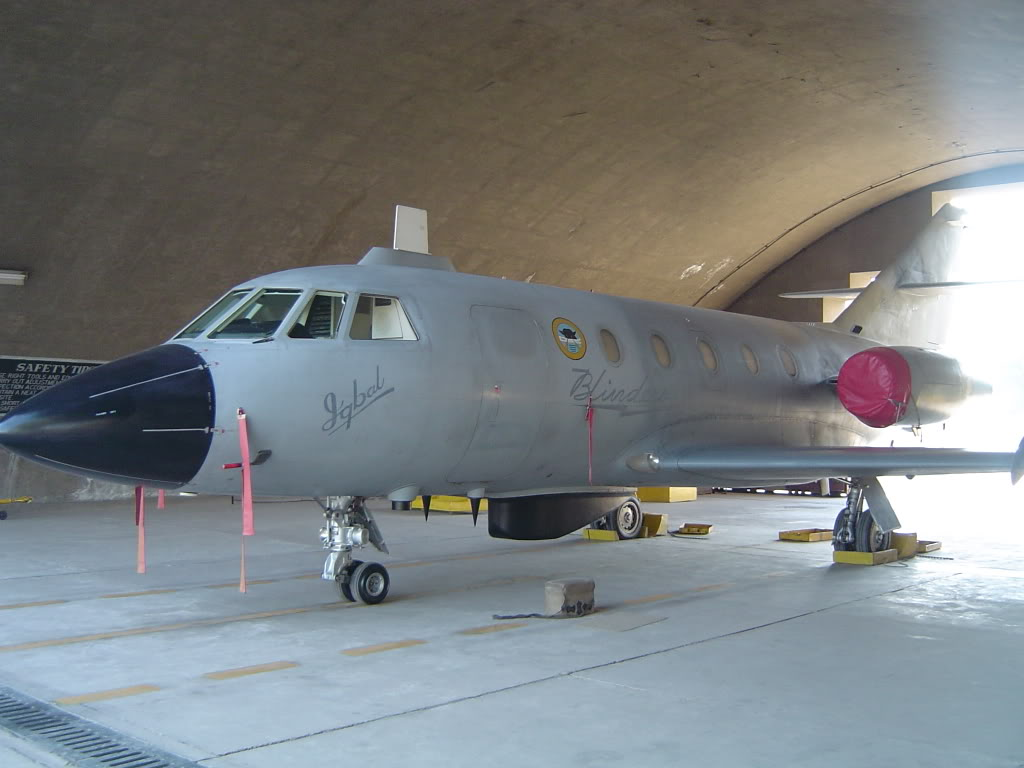
One of the two Dassault Falcon 20s of the 24 Squadron nicknamed Iqbal parked in a hangar at an operational airbase.

No. 24 Squadron Blinders
Operational	Aircraft	Role	Notes
1962-1964	RB-57B Canberra	Recce	Two US owned Big Safari versions were operated from 1962 till 1964. Also operated two PAF owned modified RB-57Bs (S/N 53-3934 and 53-3961).
1964-1966	RB-57F Canberra	Electronic surveillance	US owned but with Pakistani markings (Serial Nos. 63-13286 and 63-13287).
1987—Present	Dassault Falcon 20F	Electronic Warfare	Used for radar jamming, radar spoofing, communications jamming, airborne early warning, and electronic reconnaissance.

== Exercises ==
=== National ===
- Zarb-e-Momin 1989 - the unit flew 21 sorties.
- High Mark 89 - seventeen sorties flown.
- Naval ECM Exercise 1991
- High Mark 93 - fourteen sorties flown.
- Sky Guard 1994
- Jiddat 1995
- High Mark 95 - sixty-five sorties flown.
- Exercise Sea Lion 1996
- Exercise Sea Hawk 1997
- Joint Pakistan Army and Air Force exercise (1997) - army fire control radars tested with jamming.
- Saffron Bandit 1997 - thirty-five sorties flown. Pilots and controllers trained in ECM and almost all PAF units were exposed to operations in an environment degraded by EW.
- Pakistan Army exercise (1998) - Jamming operations carried out against Sky Guard radars and LAADS of the Army Air Defence System.

=== International ===
- Inspired Alert 94
- Inspired Alert 95
- Sea Spark 95

== Gallery ==
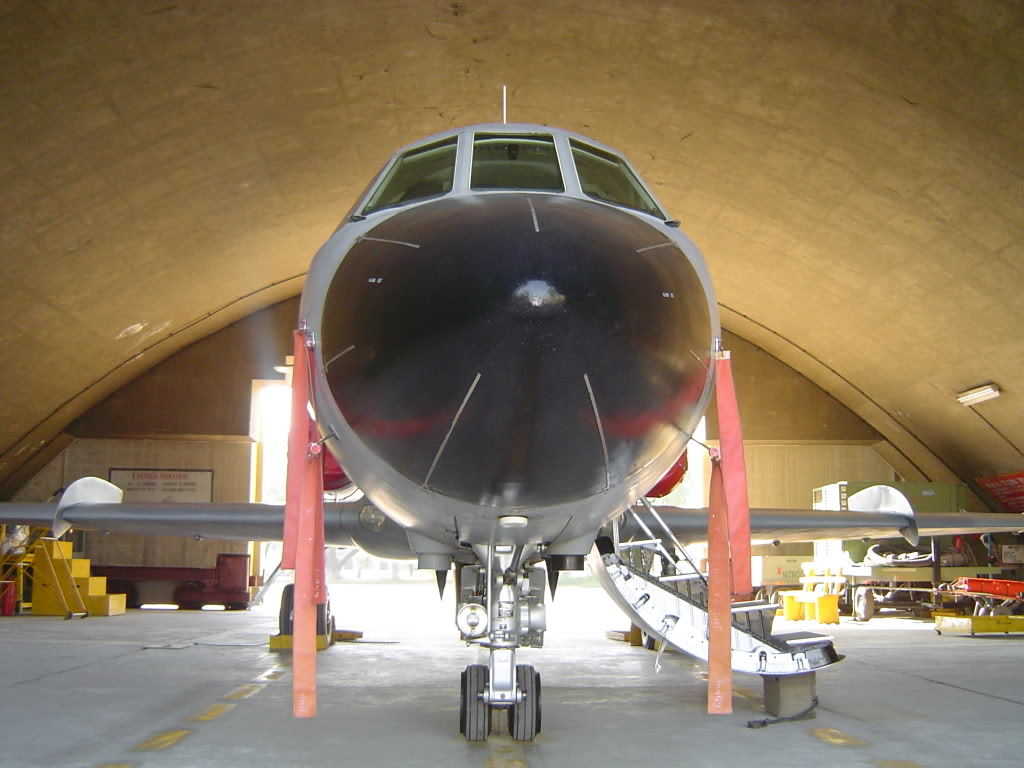

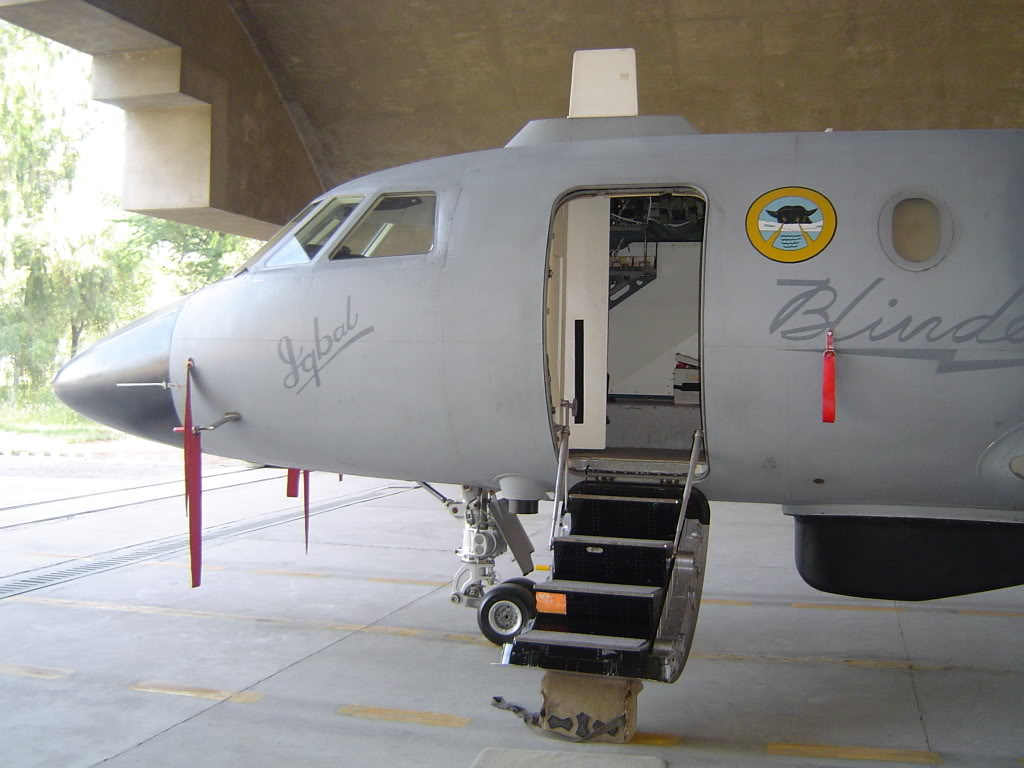

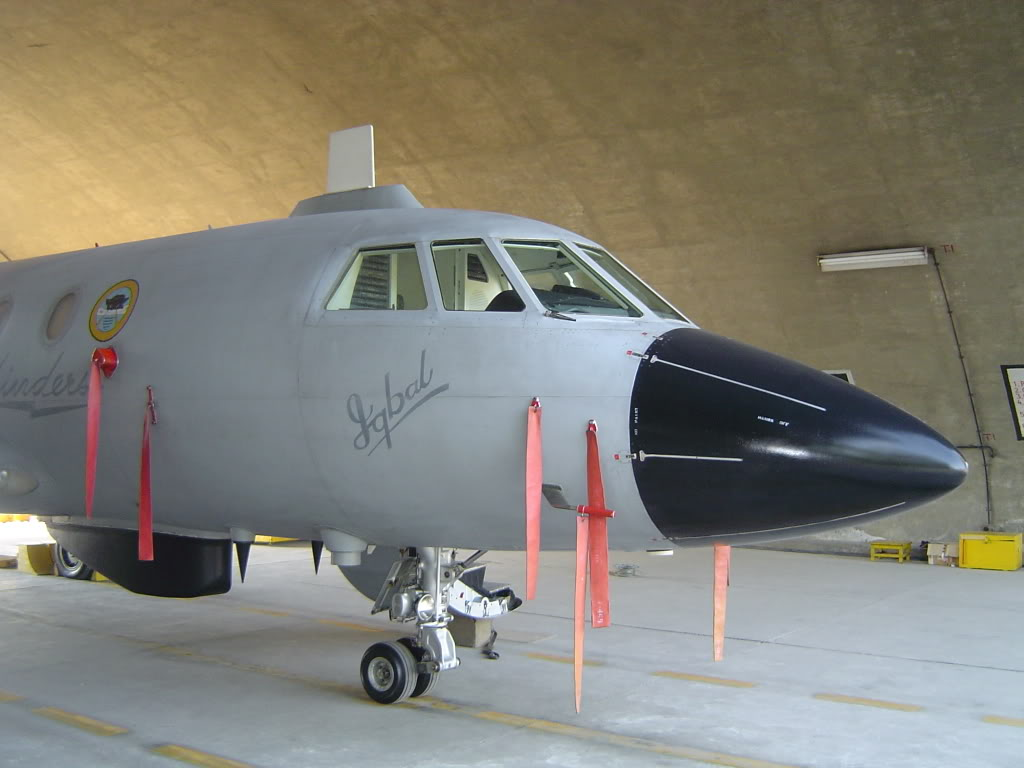

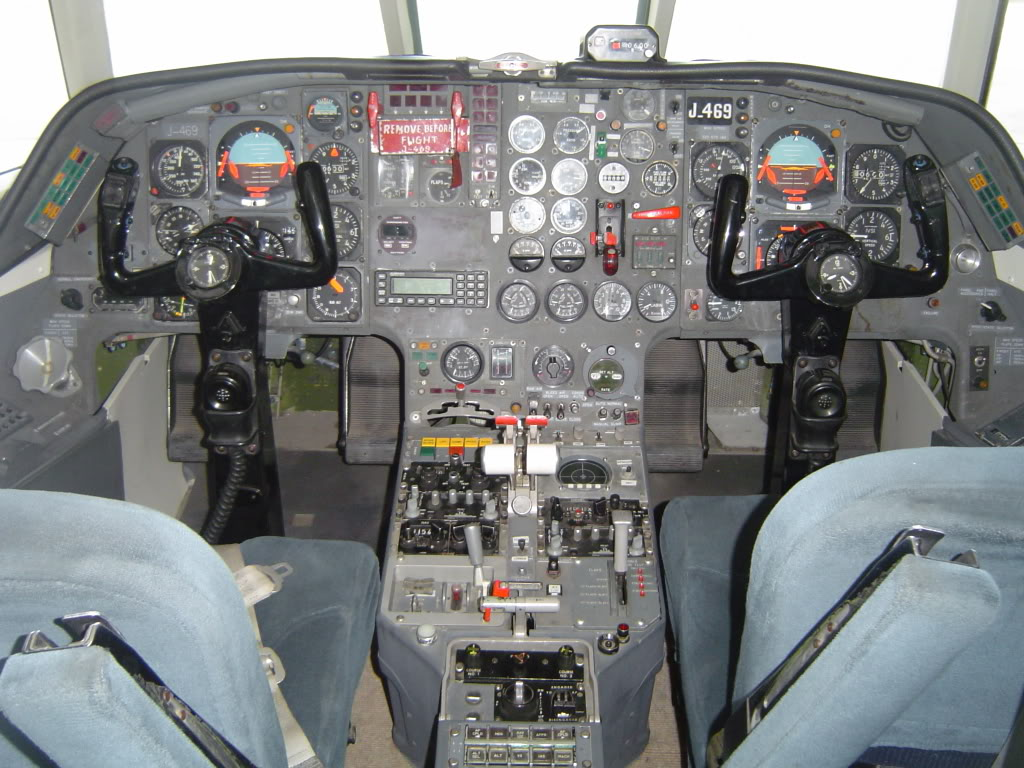
