= EPS15L1 =

Protein-coding gene in the species Homo sapiens

Identifiers
- Aliases: EPS15L1, EPS15R, epidermal growth factor receptor pathway substrate 15 like 1
- External IDs: OMIM: 616826; MGI: 104582; GeneCards: EPS15L1

Gene location (Human)
Chr.	Chromosome 19 (human)
Band	19p13.11	Start	16,355,239 bp
Band	19p13.11	End	16,472,085 bp

Gene location (Mouse)
Chr.	Chromosome 8 (mouse)
Band	8|8 B3.3	Start	73,094,843 bp
Band	8|8 B3.3	End	73,175,304 bp
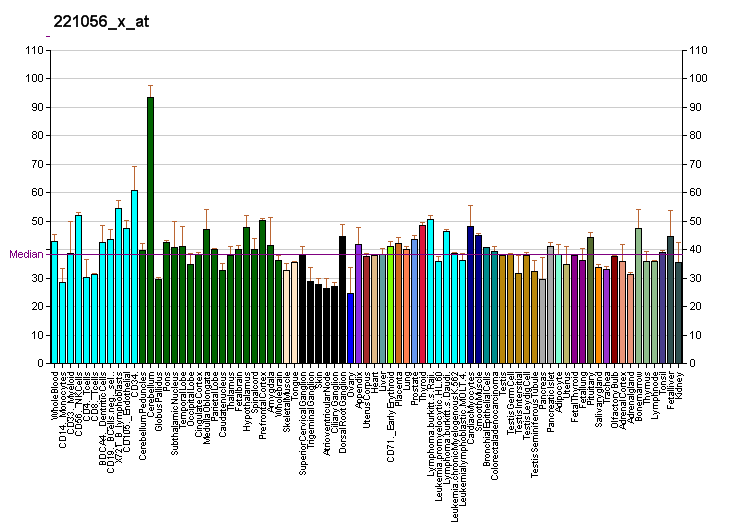

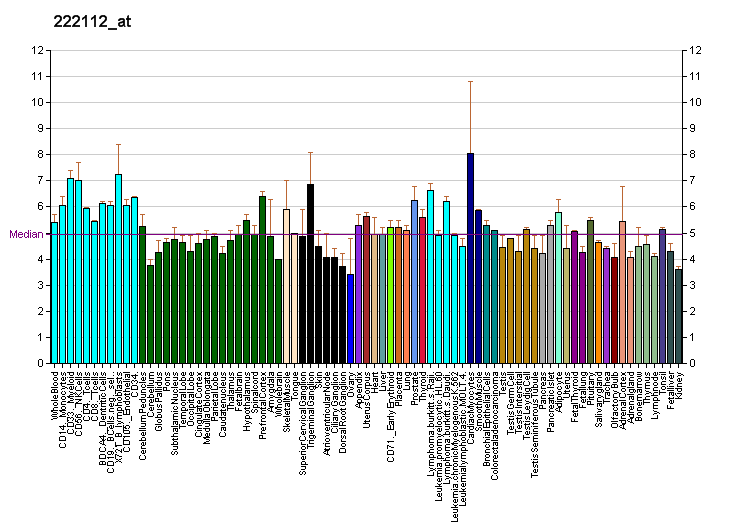

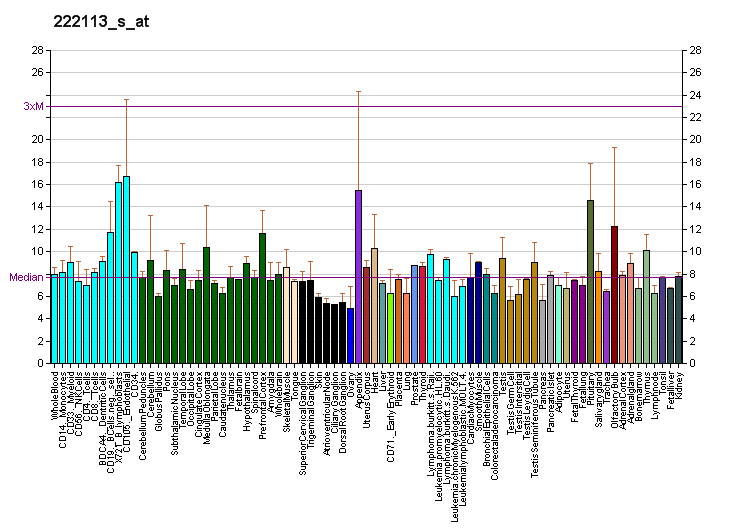
RNA expression pattern
Bgee	Human / Mouse (ortholog); Top expressed in: gastrocnemius muscle; apex of heart; muscle of thigh; right auricle of heart; right hemisphere of cerebellum; left ventricle; sural nerve; anterior pituitary; right frontal lobe; skin of leg / Top expressed in: genital tubercle; tail of embryo; zygote; ventricular zone; neural layer of retina; granulocyte; Rostral migratory stream; lip; primary oocyte; superior frontal gyrus; More reference expression data
BioGPS	More reference expression data
Gene ontology
Molecular function	calcium ion binding; protein binding; metal ion binding; cadherin binding
Cellular component	clathrin coat of coated pit; plasma membrane; clathrin-coated pit; membrane; nucleus; cytosol
Biological process	negative regulation of epidermal growth factor receptor signaling pathway; endocytosis; membrane organization
Sources:Amigo / QuickGO
Orthologs
Databases	NCBI: entry; OMA: entry
Species	Human	Mouse
Entrez	58513	13859
Ensembl	ENSG00000127527	ENSMUSG00000006276
UniProt	Q9UBC2	Q60902
RefSeq (mRNA)	NM_001258374; NM_001258375; NM_001258376; NM_021235	NM_001122832; NM_001289859; NM_007944
RefSeq (protein)	NP_001245303; NP_001245304; NP_001245305; NP_067058; NP_001245304.1	NP_001116304; NP_001276788; NP_031970
Location (UCSC)	Chr 19: 16.36 – 16.47 Mb	Chr 8: 73.09 – 73.18 Mb
PubMed search
- Wikidata
View/Edit Human	View/Edit Mouse

Epidermal growth factor receptor substrate 15-like 1 is a protein that in humans is encoded by the EPS15L1 gene.

== Interactions ==
EPS15L1 has been shown to interact with HRB.
