= Nirmal Bose =

American electrical engineer and professor

Nirmal Bose (died November 23, 2009) was a professor in the Pennsylvania State University Electrical Engineering Department, from 1986 until his death. Before joining the Penn State faculty, he taught at Syracuse University and the University of Pittsburgh.

Bose was a world-renowned expert in multidimensional signals and systems theory. He investigated high-resolution reconstructions of blurred and noisy images, and processing of noisy images. Bose has been internationally recognized for his scientific papers and books including Applied Multidimensional Systems Theory, and Digital Filters: Theory and Applications. He coauthored the texts Multidimensional Systems: Progress, Directions and Open Problems, Neural Networks Fundamentals: with Graphs, Algorithms, and Applications, and Multidimensional Systems Theory and Applications. Bose was the founding editor-in-chief of the International Journal on Multidimensional Systems and Signal Processing and served as associate editor for The Journal of the Franklin Institute, Circuits, Systems and Signal Processing, and IEEE Transactions on Circuits and Systems.

Bose received his B.Tech. (with honors) from IIT Kharagpur, M.S. from Cornell University and Ph.D. from Syracuse University, all in electrical engineering. Bose was elected to be a Fellow of Institute of Electrical and Electronics Engineers (IEEE) in 1981 for his contributions to multidimensional systems theory and circuits and systems education.

Upon his death, the head of the Penn State electrical engineering department wrote, "Dr. Bose was a world renowned expert in the field of multidimensional signals and systems who brought great international visibility and prestige to our department."

Bose served as a visiting faculty at the American University of Beirut at Lebanon, University of Maryland at College Park, University of California at Berkeley, Princeton University and Ruhr University at Bochum. From 1994 to 1995 he served as a United Nations Development Program advisor to the Government of India. He received the Alexander von Humboldt Senior Research Award and the IEEE Third Millennium Merit Medal in 2000. Bose was named the Fetter Endowment University Fellow from 2001–2004, and later the HRB Systems Professor in signal processing.
