= Northrop N-204 =

American reconnaissance aircraft design

General information
- Type: High altitude reconnaissance aircraft
- Manufacturer: Northrop Corporation
- Status: paper project only
- Primary user: United States Air Force (intended)
- Number built: none completed

The Northrop N-204 was a high altitude reconnaissance jet aircraft designed in the United States in the 1950s.

== Development ==
In fall 1957, Northrop submitted a proposal to the United States Air Force for a subsonic high-altitude reconnaissance aircraft, having capitalized on the company's earlier N-165 design study. The concerns by CIA pilots that the Lockheed U-2 was being tracked by radars on spy missions over the Soviet Union prompted Northrop to make low observable technology a part of the N-204 design, as was later done with the Lockheed A-12.

Although Northrop estimated that the N-204 could go into service in 1960, the N-204 project did not proceed to the hardware stage.

== Design ==
The N-204 was similar to the Lockheed U-2 and Yakovlev Yak-25RV in having long, straight wings like an ordinary sailplane, and a v-tail. However, the engines of the aircraft were not buried in the wing roots or podded under the wings, but instead were buried in the outboard end of the wing center-section.

== Specifications (estimated) ==
Data from

General characteristics

- Crew: two, pilot and flight engineer/RSO officer
- Length: 105 ft 8 in (32.2 m)
- Wingspan: 273 ft 9 in (83.44 m)
- Wing area: 5,000 sq ft (464.52 m^{2})
- Gross weight: 34,000 lb (15,422 kg)
- Max takeoff weight: 75,000 lb (34,019 kg)
- Powerplant: 8 × Westinghouse J54 turbojets, 6,075 lbf (27.02 kN) thrust each

Performance

- Maximum speed: 480 kn (553 mph, 885 km/h)
- Range: 3,000 nmi (3,452 mi, 5,556 km)
- Service ceiling: 85,000 ft (25,908 m)

== See also ==
Aircraft of comparable role, configuration, and era

- Beriev S-13
- Lockheed U-2
- Martin RB-57D Canberra
- Yakovlev Yak-25RV
