= AGFG1 =

Protein-coding gene in humans

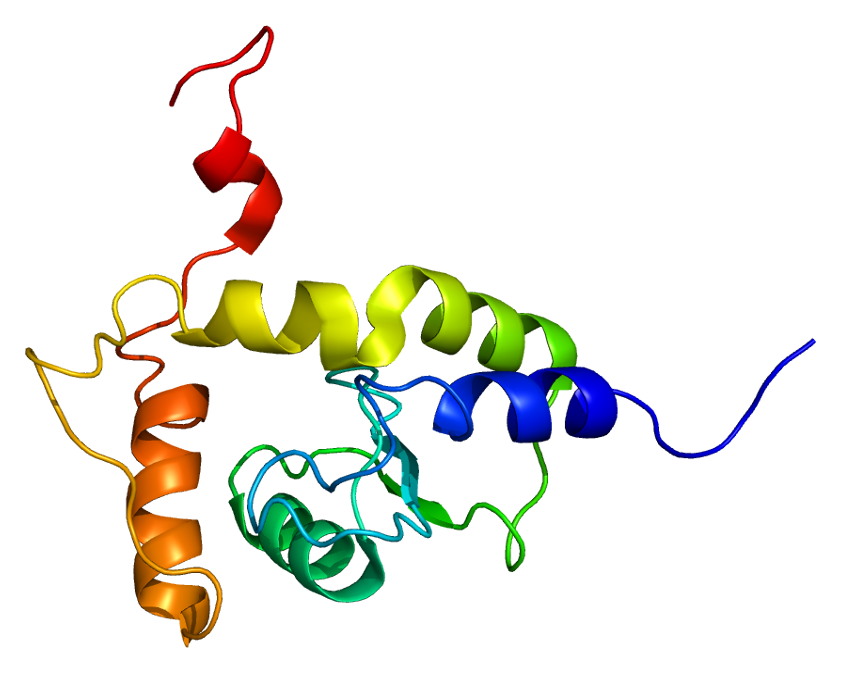

Identifiers
- Aliases: AGFG1, HRB, RAB, RIP, ArfGAP with FG repeats 1
- External IDs: OMIM: 600862; MGI: 1333754; GeneCards: AGFG1
Available structures
PDB	Ortholog search: PDBe RCSB
PDB	List of PDB id codes 2D9L, 2OLM, 2VX8

Gene location (Human)
Chr.	Chromosome 2 (human)
Band	2q36.3	Start	227,472,152 bp
Band	2q36.3	End	227,561,217 bp

Gene location (Mouse)
Chr.	Chromosome 1 (mouse)
Band	1|1 C5	Start	82,817,204 bp
Band	1|1 C5	End	82,878,903 bp
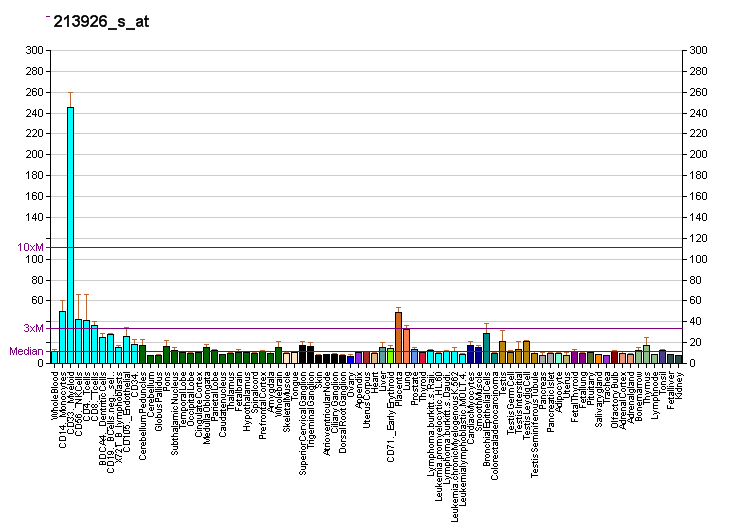

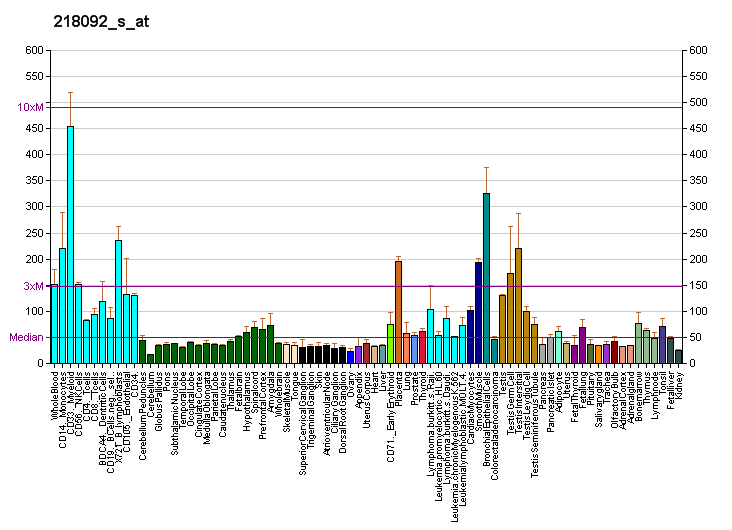

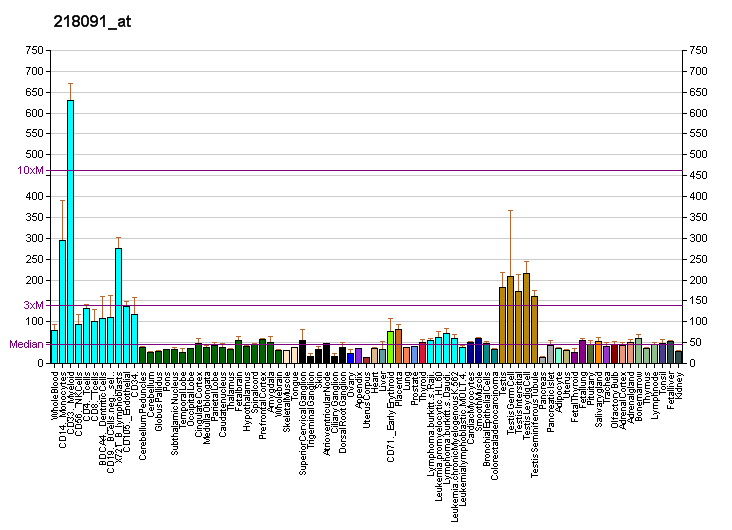
RNA expression pattern
Bgee	Human / Mouse (ortholog); Top expressed in: sperm; islet of Langerhans; right testis; left testis; right lung; C1 segment; monocyte; upper lobe of left lung; bone marrow; gallbladder / Top expressed in: fetal liver hematopoietic progenitor cell; endocardial cushion; medullary collecting duct; atrioventricular valve; human fetus; left lung lobe; ureter; lumbar spinal ganglion; stroma of bone marrow; seminiferous tubule; More reference expression data
BioGPS	More reference expression data
Gene ontology
Molecular function	DNA binding; GTPase activator activity; metal ion binding; protein binding; RNA binding
Cellular component	cell projection; intracellular membrane-bounded organelle; nuclear pore; soma; cytoplasmic vesicle; nucleus; cytosol
Biological process	intermediate filament organization; cell differentiation; mRNA transport; mRNA export from nucleus; multicellular organism development; positive regulation of GTPase activity; acrosome assembly; spermatogenesis; spermatid nucleus differentiation; membrane organization
Sources:Amigo / QuickGO
Orthologs
Databases	NCBI: entry; OMA: entry
Species	Human	Mouse
Entrez	3267	15463
Ensembl	ENSG00000173744	ENSMUSG00000026159
UniProt	P52594	Q8K2K6
RefSeq (mRNA)	NM_001135187; NM_001135188; NM_001135189; NM_004504	NM_010472; NM_001310713; NM_001347077; NM_001368850
RefSeq (protein)	NP_001128659; NP_001128660; NP_001128661; NP_004495	NP_001297642; NP_001334006; NP_034602; NP_001355779
Location (UCSC)	Chr 2: 227.47 – 227.56 Mb	Chr 1: 82.82 – 82.88 Mb
PubMed search
- Wikidata
View/Edit Human	View/Edit Mouse

Arf-GAP domain and FG repeat-containing protein 1 is a protein that in humans is encoded by the AGFG1 gene.

== Function ==
The protein encoded by this gene is related to nucleoporins, a class of proteins that mediate nucleocytoplasmic transport. This encoded protein binds the Rev activation domain when Rev is assembled onto its RNA target and can significantly enhance Rev activity when overexpressed. Several alternatively spliced transcript variants of this gene have been described, but the full-length nature of some of these variants has not been determined.

== Interactions ==
AGFG1 has been shown to interact with EPS15L1 and EPS15.
