= HRB Systems =

American defense contractor

HRB Systems Inc., now part of Raytheon Intelligence and Information Systems, is a defense contractor located in State College, Pennsylvania.

== History ==
This company was started by three scientists: Haller, Raymond, and Brown. Initially, the firm provided imagery support, then transitioned to signal analysis and processing.

The company was acquired by Singer, and became known as HRB-Singer, one of the firms in the Singer Defense Systems Group, dealing with infrared reconnaissance techniques and equipments. It was physically located on the East side of Science Park Road, in State College.

The company had a strong internal R&D effort which was quite successful. HRB-Singer provided signal processing equipment and expertise to the US Department of Defense and to international clients in Europe and Asia.

In 1988, Singer sold off the Defense unit to corporate raider Paul Bilzerian, who sold each of the companies separately. HRB division was sold to Hadson Corporation for $137 million in cash and two million shares of Hadson common stock. Subsequently acquired by E-Systems, HRB was downsized to a considerable degree.

The company was later acquired by Raytheon.

Nirmal Bose of the Pennsylvania State University is the HRB Professorship in Signal Processing in the Department of Electrical Engineering.
