= 645th Aeronautical Systems Group =

US Air Force rapid procurement program group

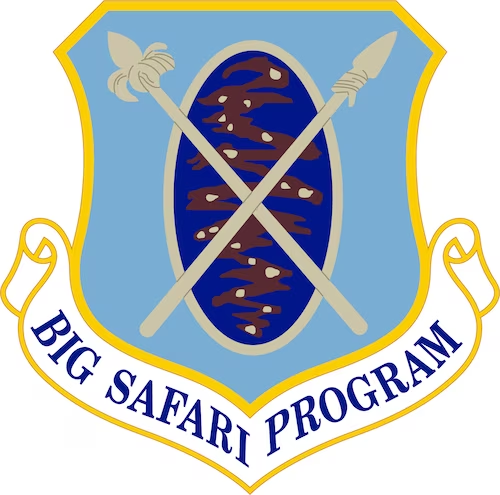
Emblem of the 645 Aeronautical Systems Group

Big Safari is a United States Air Force program begun in 1952 which provides management, direction, and control of the acquisition, modification, and logistics support for special purpose weapons systems derived from existing aircraft and systems. To that end, the program operates under procurement procedures which allow it in most cases to designate the contractor. The sole-source arrangement that allows the pairing of contractors to specific requirements is paramount to the program's success.

The program's mission statement begins:

The BIG SAFARI acquisition and sustainment system employs the necessary flexibility to respond to high-priority, dynamic operational requirements for programs that involve a limited number of systems that require a rapid response to changes in the operational environment throughout the life of the system. BIG SAFARI focuses on acquiring, fielding, and sustaining key operational capabilities that otherwise would not be achievable or supportable in the required timeframe. Events and processes are tailored to meet the user's operational and schedule needs.

The program was reconstituted as the BIG SAFARI Systems Group on 23 November 2004 and activated as same on 18 January 2005. It was redesignated as the 645th Aeronautical Systems Group (645 ASG) on 14 July 2006 and is now aligned as the 645th Aeronautical Systems Group (Big Safari) under the 303rd Aeronautical Systems Wing (303 ASW) of the Air Force Materiel Command, although the program itself receives some direction from National Air and Space Intelligence Center (NASIC).

Both the 645 ASG (Big Safari) and 303 ASW are headquartered at Wright-Patterson AFB, although Big Safari also has facilities at Hanscom AFB and Majors Airport in Greenville, Texas. The program oversees, among other aircraft, the RC-135 and EC-130 aircraft as well as unmanned aerial vehicles and remotely piloted aircraft.

The Air Force has referred to Big Safari as a "rapid procurement force," which tests the fielding of new weapons systems, sensors, and platforms. By some accounts, the program has been operating since the late 1950s, when the BQM-34 Firefly drone was procured and evaluated. This effort led to the first operational unmanned reconnaissance vehicle, the redesignated Ryan Aeronautical AQM-34 Lightning Bug. Programs conducted under the auspices of Big Safari are identified by two-word names beginning with the word "Rivet." For instance, the RC-135V and RC-135W model aircraft are part of the "Rivet Joint" program.

The program is still operational as of 6 May 2022.

== See also ==
- List of U.S. Department of Defense and partner code names

== Bibliography ==
- Grimes, Bill (2014). The History of Big Safari. Archway Publishing. ISBN 978-1-4808-0456-2.
