= Martin RB-57D Canberra =

Military reconnaissance aircraft developed 1956

RB-57D Canberra
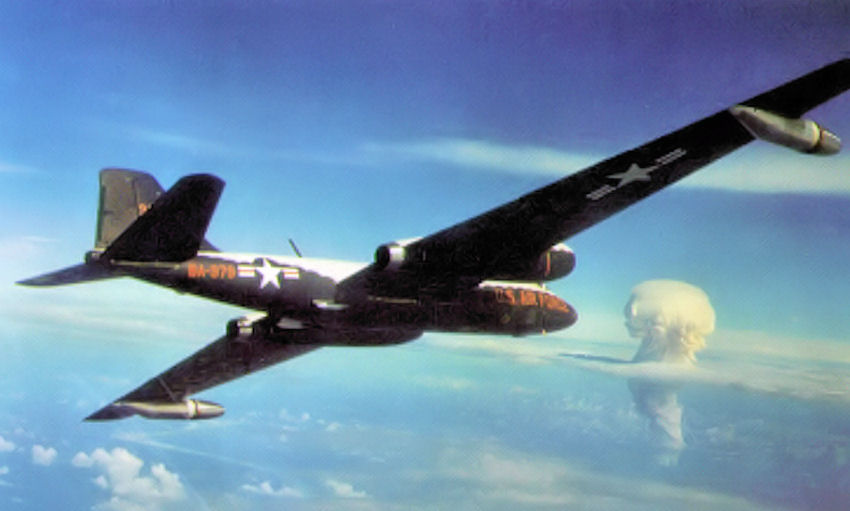
- Martin RB-57D-2 Model 796 53–3979 collecting atmospheric particle samples during Juniper nuclear bomb explosion; Operation Hardtack I Bikini atomic experiments, 22 July 1958.

General information
- Type: Reconnaissance
- Manufacturer: Martin
- Status: Retired
- Primary users: United States Air Force Republic of China Air Force
- Number built: 20

History
- Introduction date: April 1956
- First flight: 3 November 1955
- Retired: 1979 (EB-57D)
- Developed from: Martin B-57 Canberra
- Developed into: Martin/General Dynamics RB-57F Canberra

The Martin RB-57D Canberra is a specialized high-altitude strategic reconnaissance aircraft developed from the Martin B-57 Canberra tactical bomber, a license-built version of the English Electric Canberra. It was used by the United States Air Force during the 1950s prior to operational use of the Lockheed U-2.

== Development ==
The RB-57D was built strictly as a high-altitude reconnaissance aircraft. It originated in a December 1952 USAF study funded by the Wright Air Development Center for a turbojet-powered special reconnaissance aircraft with a radius of 2,000 nautical miles (3,700 km; 2,300 mi) that could operate at altitudes of 65,000 feet (20,000 m). Subsonic performance was considered to be acceptable and it was felt that no defensive armament would be needed. The RB-57D was unique and set the stage for high-altitude reconnaissance operations in the rarefied air of the stratosphere. Preliminary specifications were prepared by the Air Force on 27 March 1953. The project was carried out in high secrecy. It was known as Weapon System MX-2147, and the code name was Bald Eagle.

The basic B-57 Canberra design was used as a starting point for the D model, but there were several significant changes incorporated. The most obvious was the greatly enlarged wing. The wingspan was lengthened by 42 feet (13 m) to 106 feet (32 m) overall. The chord of the wing was also increased, which combined with the increased length gave the wing a very high lift capability.

The second major change to the RB-57D was the addition of Pratt & Whitney J57 engines in place of the Wright J65 engines used on all earlier B-57 models. The two J57 engines produced about 20,000 lbf (89.0 kN) total thrust, about 6,000 lbf (26.7 kN) more than the two J65 engines. Other changes in the D model included removal of all fuselage fuel tanks and the addition of "wet wing" fuel cells. All defensive armament was removed, and the bomb bay was also removed and replaced by avionics equipment. The horizontal stabilizer was changed to the variable incidence or "all flying" type. Spoilers were added to the outboard wings to assist the ailerons in roll axis control.

Despite the very enlarged wing, an empty RB-57D weighed not much more than an empty B-57 due to the lightening measures taken. The most extreme measures were taken with the wings, which were thin metal honeycomb sections that formed a full wet wing (even in the leading edges). To avoid the weight of rivets, the wings were assembled with a special glue. The wing skin was waxed for aerodynamic smoothness. With a surface skin of only 0.010 inch thick, dropping a small tool on the wing could damage the skin. Even deicing fluid used on the aircraft could potentially cause the glue used to lose strength.

On takeoff, only 50% engine power was necessary for a takeoff ground roll of about 2,000 feet (610 m). Climbing at 25–30 degrees, the RB-57Ds could reach 50,000 feet (15,000 m) in just 15 minutes. Maximum cruise altitude was 65,000 feet (20,000 m) and the pilots wore full pressure suits. With 200 US gallons (760 L; 170 imp gal) of fuel less than a stock B-57, the RB-57D had twice the duration, approximately seven hours compared to four hours for a B-57. Landing was challenging, as the big wing would fly at very low speeds, and the small thrust the engines produced at idle made it difficult to reduce speed for touchdown. Even with the spoilers out and landing gear extended, the plane had a very low sink rate and pilots resorted to holding the RB-57Ds into a series of slight stalls to get the aircraft down to the runway.

=== Production ===
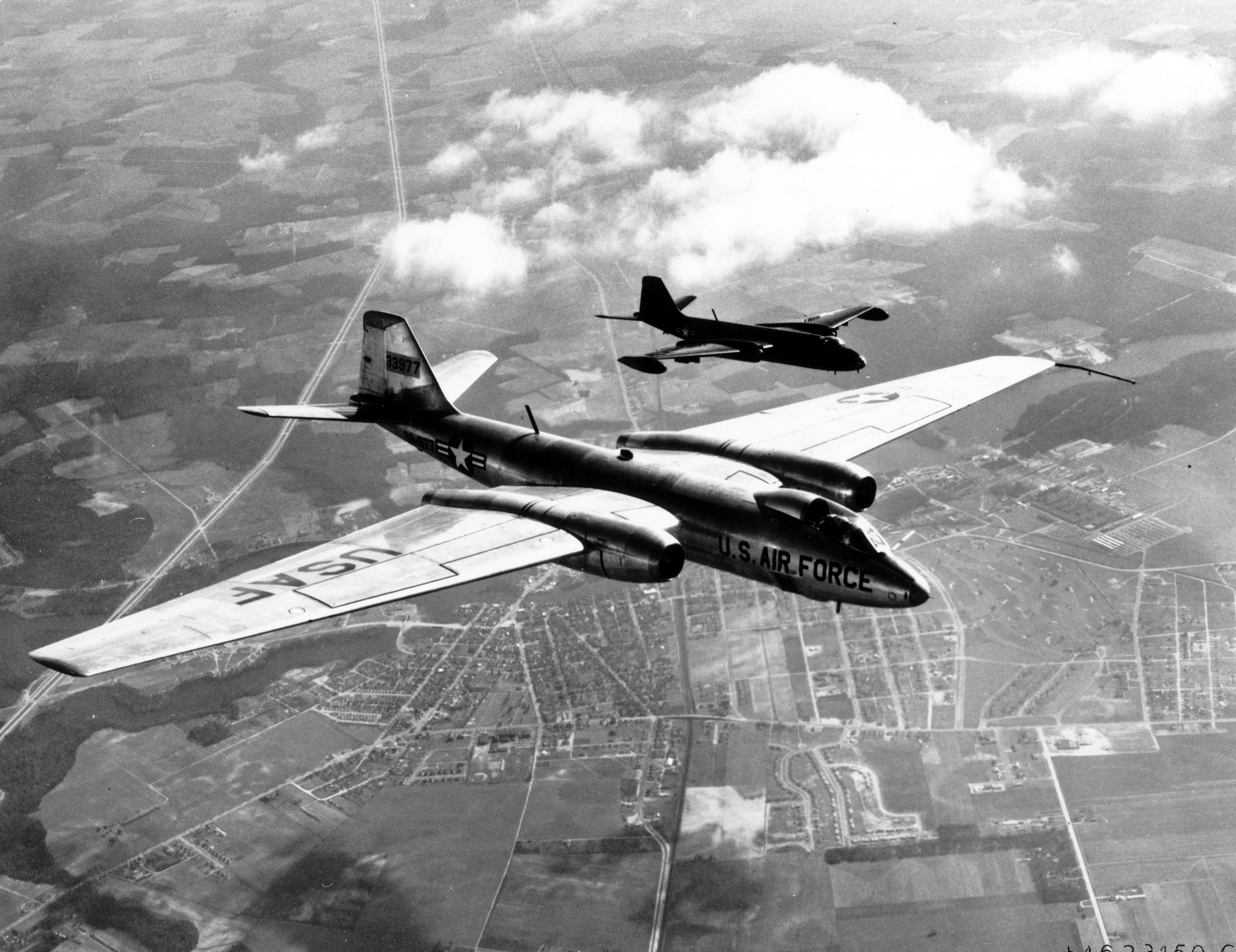
Martin RB-57D 53-3977 shown in-flight with a Tactical Air Command B-57A bomber (black plane in this formation)

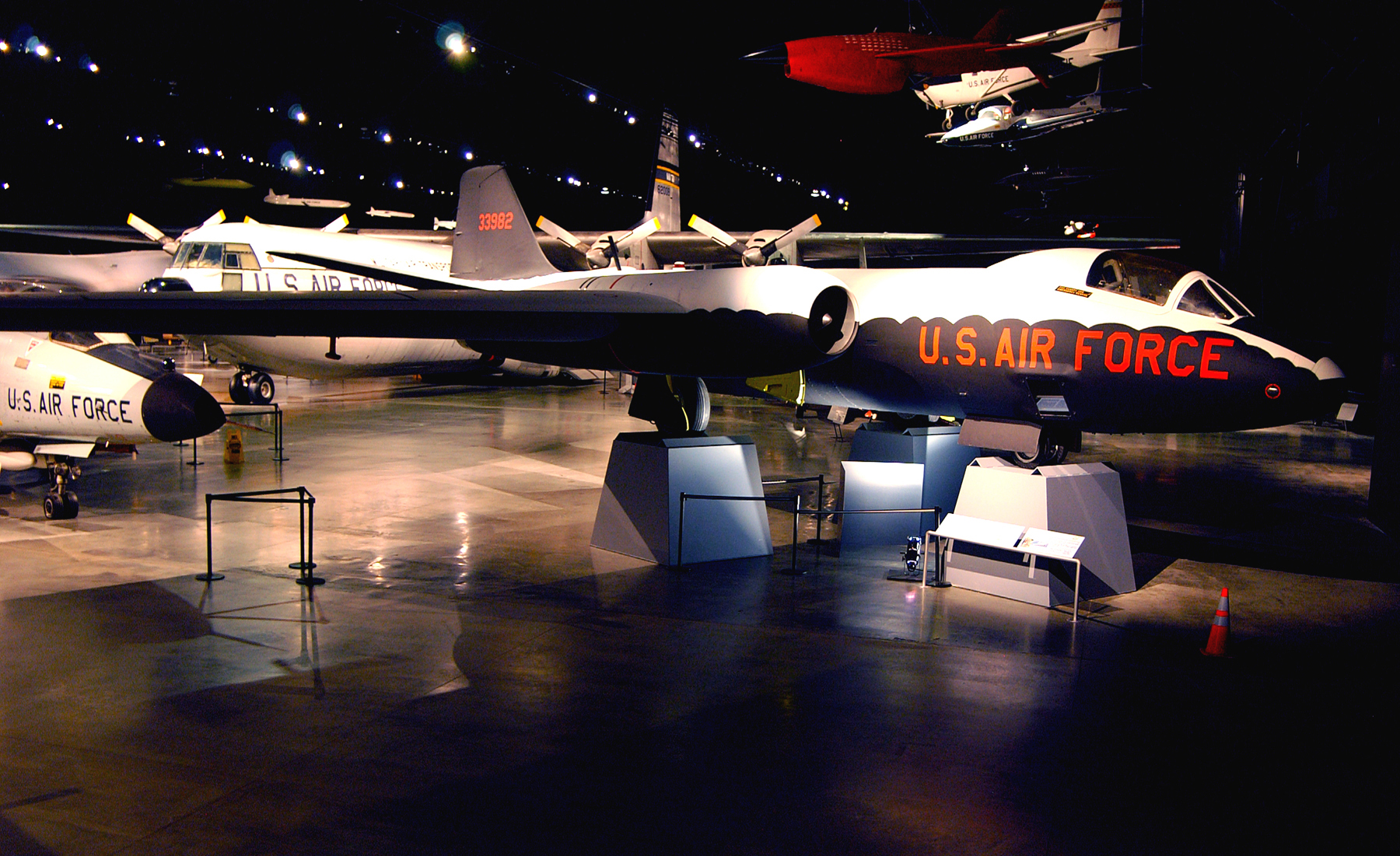
RB-57D 53-3982 at the National Museum of the United States Air Force

Only 20 RB-57Ds were built, but there were four basic variants that each had mission specific changes incorporated into the design.

- 6 – RB-57D Model 294 (53–3977 to 53–3982) – (Group A) Basic configuration built as single-seat aircraft. The primary mission of these aircraft was high-altitude photo reconnaissance. There were four reconnaissance cameras (two K38 and two KC1) mounted in the forward lower fuselage.
- 7 – RB-57D Model 744 (53–3970 to 53–3976) – (Group B) Basic configuration with in-flight refuelling.
- 1 – RB-57D-1 (53–3963) – (Type C) Single-seat basic version, but its mission was electronic (radar) reconnaissance. This type did not have any cameras but had an extensive suite of radar equipment installed throughout the fuselage. The aircraft had a nose radome housing an AN/APN-107 radar antenna. A number of search radars and an AN/APQ-56 Side Looking Airborne Radar (SLAR) were mounted within the fuselage. The SLAR was primarily used for radar mapping and its antennas were mounted on the lower fuselage just below the aft wing. These antennas gave the D-1 a unique appearance.
- 6 – RB-57D-2 Model 796 (53–3964 to 53–3969) – (Group D) Dual-seat version, pilot and electronic warfare officer/observer—and was designed for the electronic ferret mission. The aircraft had the same AN/APN-107 nose radar, but also had an AN/APA-69A radar with an antenna mounted in a distinctive belly radome.

The first RB-57D flew on 5 November 1955.

== Operational history ==
=== USAF ===
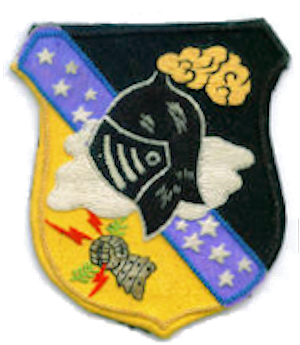

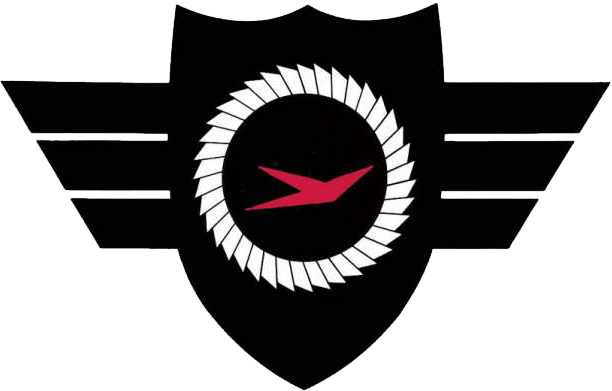

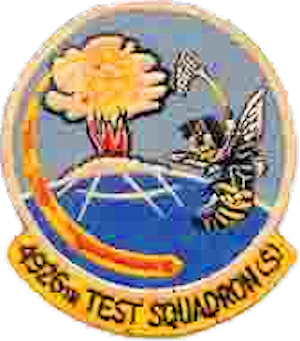

The RB-57D remained in service for only about five years. The first deliveries were in April 1956 to the 4025th Strategic Reconnaissance Squadron, 4080th Strategic Reconnaissance Wing, which was a part of Strategic Air Command (SAC). Initially, the planes were to be based at Lockbourne AFB, Ohio, but they were soon relocated to Turner AFB, Georgia.

The squadron would become fully operational with its first six RB-57Ds only 120 days from the delivery of its first RB-57D. Those first six aircraft, all Group A RB-57Ds, deployed Yokota AB, Japan and to Eielson AFB, Alaska in late 1956 for reconnaissance missions over what is presumed to be China, North Korea and the Soviet Union. The detachment at Yokota was used to monitor fall-out from Soviet tests in Operation Sea Lion. Other sorties were flown over Communist China, the RB-57D's operational ceiling being well above that of Chinese MiG-15s. The Eielson-based aircraft conducted ELINT around the Kamchatka Peninsula of the Soviet Union. On 15 December 1956 three aircraft overflew Vladivostok.

In early 1956, the 4080th SR Wing moved to Laughlin AFB, Texas. Midair-refuelling capable RB-57Ds (Group B and the sole Type C) were deployed in 1957 to Rhein-Main AB, West Germany to support USAFE operations. All RB-57D operations were under heavy security and very little information ever leaked out about their early operations. They presumably carried out ELINT/SIGINT missions along the East German border and over the Baltic Sea. Since the missions were carried out under an atmosphere of high secrecy, RB-57s returning from missions over the Baltic were often intercepted by RAF Hawker Hunter interceptors just to make sure that they were not Soviet aircraft. These particular versions of the RB-57Ds had the guts ripped out of the fuselage. They were equipped with a camera with a 24 feet (730 cm) focal length from lens to aperture. They produced individual frames that were developed as large as 4'x6' for CIA analysts to go over in great detail when looking for missile silos throughout Eastern Europe. The pilot and navigator who flew these missions never even got to view the film they shot. Upon landing a CIA employee would take the film before they even left their seats in their planes. When the 4025th SRS was inactivated in June 1959 the RB-57D aircraft were assigned to the 7407th Support Squadron at Rhein-Main AB, two additional aircraft added to complement including the unique RB-57D-1 equipped with SLR. Intelligence gathering sorties by the RB-57's in West Germany continued until 1964 when wing fatigue problems caused the type to be withdrawn from service.

The RB-57Ds of the 4926th Test Squadron (later 1211th Test Squadron) at Kirtland AFB, New Mexico, participated in support of atomic bomb tests at Eniwetok Atoll in the Marshall Islands and at the AEC testing range in Nevada during 1957–1963. The high flying capability of the RB-57Ds allowed them to get nuclear particle samples from high in the atmosphere as part of the post-detonation analysis.

=== CIA ===
In 1958, the Central Intelligence Agency started sponsoring a program known as Diamond Lil, in which Chinese Nationalist pilots were trained to fly RB-57Ds. Six Black Cat Squadron Taiwanese pilots were trained on the B-57C at Laughlin AFB, Texas, arriving back in Taiwan, and two or three Group A RB-57Ds were ferried to Taoyuan Air Base, near Taipei, Taiwan in early 1959. During early 1959, they carried out deep penetration reconnaissance flights over mainland China, photographing airfields, military establishments and ports. They flew in Republic of China Air Force markings, being painted white on top and black on the bottom with lettering stenciled in red.

RB-57D "5643", piloted by Capt Ying-Chin Wang, was shot down and killed on 7 October 1959 by a People's Liberation Army SA-2 surface-to-air missile, which was the first successful shoot-down of an aircraft ever achieved by a SAM. The program ended around 1964, when fatigue problems with the wing spars forced the retirement of the surviving aircraft, which was returned to the US. They were replaced by four Lockheed U-2s, all of which were subsequently lost in operations over mainland China.

=== Retirement ===
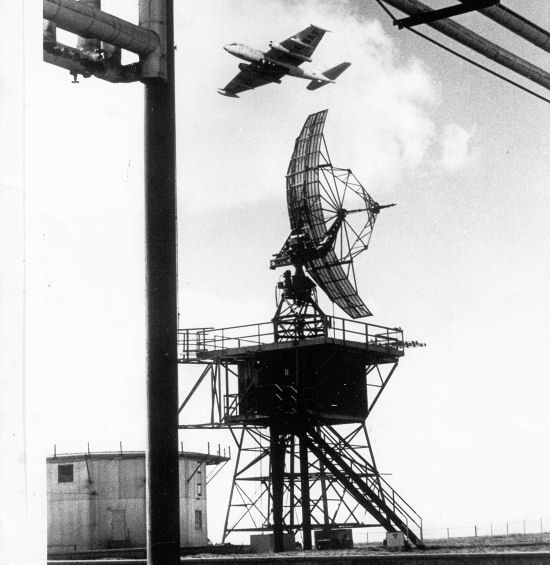
EB-57D of the 4713th DSES flying over a General Electric AN/FPS-6 radar

The pace of missions put a strain on the delicate wings of the RB-57D and the first aircraft were put into storage by SAC following two incidents when the wings outboard of the engine nacelles cracked and fell off during landing. Martin had designed the wings for only 500 flight hours and many of them had already exceeded that limit but strategic necessity resulted in the RB-57Ds still flying missions. The 4025th SRS was discontinued in June 1959. Some of the RB-57Ds that had been operating with the 4025th SRS were adapted to other specialist roles.

Air Defense Command took over the remaining RB-57Ds to act as high-altitude targets for the supersonic interceptor force. Martin modified the wings to extend their service life. Fitted out with electronic countermeasures, the 4677th Defense Systems Evaluation Squadron at Hill AFB, Utah, was formed to operate 12 of the 20 RB-57Ds to fly training missions against continental Radar defense installations as electronic "aggressor" aircraft. The upgrades to the electronic countermeasures to challenge the ADC interceptor crews resulted in these aircraft being designated EB-57Ds

Some were used by NASA for high-altitude flight testing and terrain mapping. A few aircraft were transferred to Taiwan in the late 1950s for high-altitude reconnaissance missions.

Six more RB-57Ds were used to monitor the last series of American atmospheric nuclear tests which took place in 1962. Three RB-57Ds were assigned to the 1211th Test Squadron (Sampling) of the MATS Air Weather Service at Kirtland AFB, New Mexico and were re-designated WB-57D.

In 1964, an RB-57D which was operating on test flights out of Wright-Patterson AFB (53–3973), lost its wing at 50,000 feet (15,000 m) over Dayton, Ohio and crashed into the parking lot of Beavercreek High School. No-one was injured and the pilot was able to eject safely. This mishap forced all the surviving RB-57Ds to be withdrawn from service and grounded. But the ADC still needed a high-altitude target aircraft, and Martin agreed to modify the remaining EB-57Ds for another 3,000 flight hours, and they served in this role along with other testing roles until the last was retired in July 1979 due to wing-spar fractures.

An even larger B-57 reconnaissance version was the 122 feet (37 m) wingspan RB-57F. Beginning in 1963, General Dynamics converted 21 B-57 airframes (four of them RB-57Ds) into RB-57Fs. These aircraft performed missions similar to the RB-57D, and the last USAF-operated RB-57F was retired in the early 1970s.

Clarence "Kelly" Johnson of Lockheed submitted an unsolicited proposal on his own which eventually edged out the RB-57D design, resulting in the Lockheed U-2. The USAF considered the U-2 a more capable aircraft and so it replaced the RB-57D in U.S. strategic reconnaissance units.

== Operators ==
Taiwan

- Republic of China Air Force

United States

- United States Air Force
- NASA

== Aircraft on display ==
RB-57D

- 53–3982 – National Museum of the United States Air Force, Wright-Patterson AFB, Dayton, Ohio. This RB-57D is one of the 13 photoreconnaissance RB-57Ds. Painted as it appeared in the late 1950s while it served in the 4025th SRS(L), it went on display in 2004.

== Specifications ==
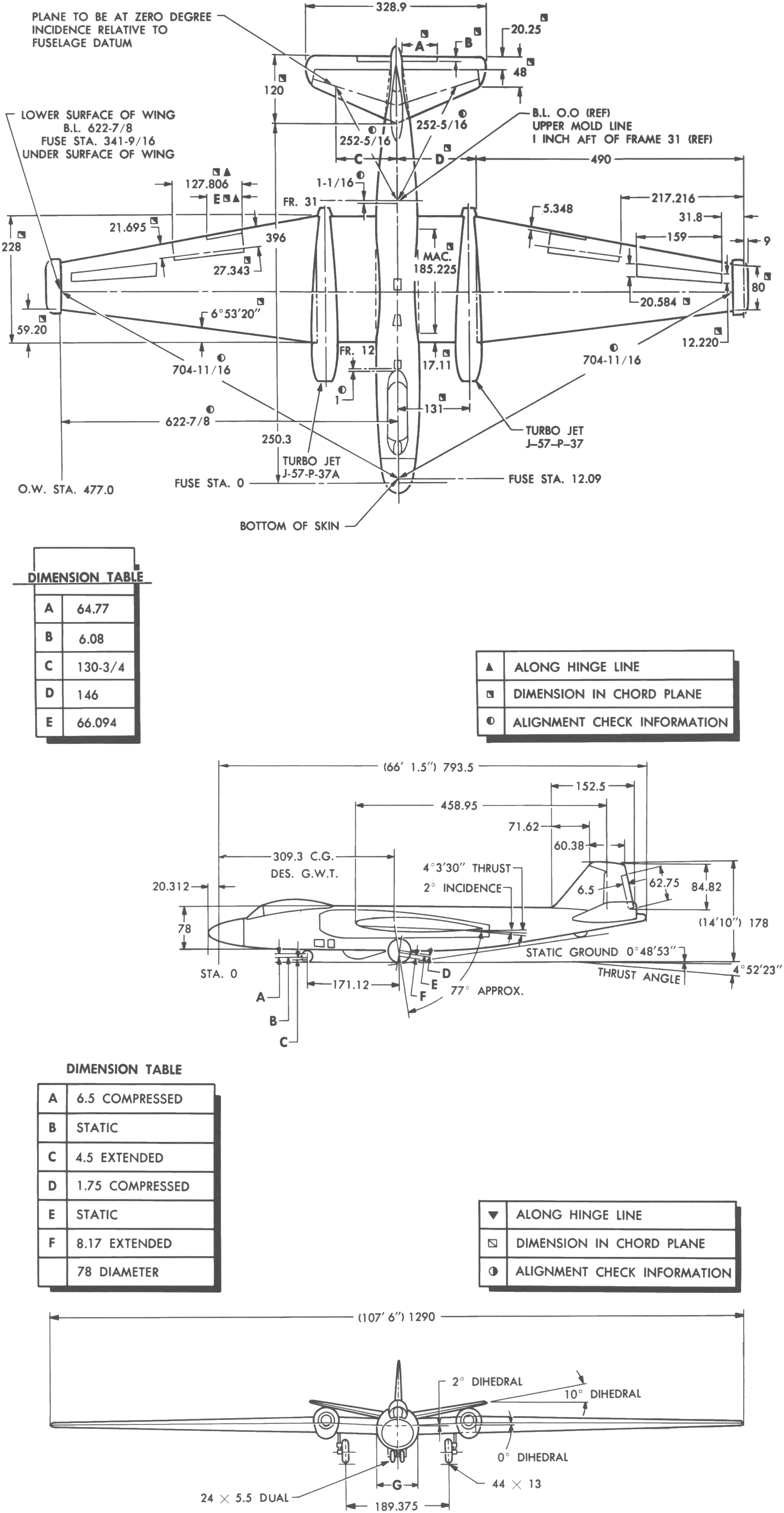
3-view line drawing of the Martin RB-57D Canberra

Data from

General characteristics

- Crew: 1 or 2
- Length: 66 ft 0 in (20.1 m) depending on variant
- Wingspan: 106 ft 0 in (32.3 m)
- Height: 15 ft 7 in (4.7 m)
- Max takeoff weight: 59,000 lb (26,760 kg) approximately
- Powerplant: 2 × Pratt & Whitney J57-P-9 turbojets, 10,000 lbf (44 kN) thrust each

Performance

- Maximum speed: 520 kn (600 mph, 966 km/h) at 45,000 ft (14,000 m)
- Cruise speed: 420 kn (480 mph, 780 km/h) at 65,000 ft (20,000 m)
- Combat range: 1,700 nmi (2,000 mi, 3,200 km) approximately
- Service ceiling: 70,000 ft (21,300 m) approximately

== See also ==
Related development

- English Electric Canberra
- Martin B-57 Canberra
- Martin/General Dynamics RB-57F Canberra

Related lists

- List of United States Air Force reconnaissance aircraft
