= North American F-86 Sabre =

Family of US fighter aircraft

F-86 Sabre
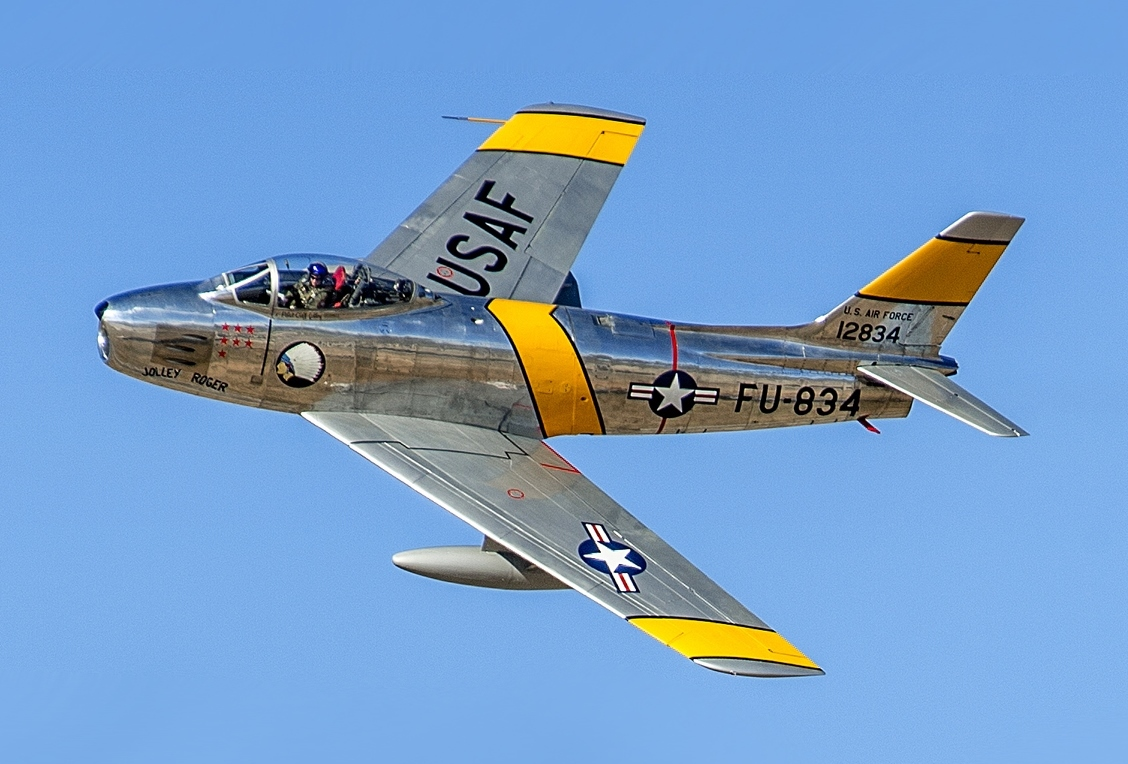
- An F-86 Sabre during a Heritage Flight over Davis–Monthan AFB

General information
- Type: Fighter aircraft
- National origin: United States
- Manufacturer: North American Aviation
- Primary users: United States Air Force Japan Air Self-Defense Force; Spanish Air Force; Republic of Korea Air Force
- Number built: 9,860

History
- Introduction date: 1949, with USAF
- First flight: 1 October 1947
- Retired: 1994 (Bolivian Air Force)
- Developed from: North American FJ-1 Fury
- Variants: Canadair Sabre; North American FJ-2/-3 Fury
- Developed into: CAC Sabre; North American F-86D Sabre; North American FJ-4 Fury; North American YF-93; North American F-100 Super Sabre

The North American F-86 Sabre, sometimes called the Sabrejet, is a transonic, jet-powered fighter aircraft. Produced by North American Aviation, the Sabre is best known as the United States' first swept-wing fighter that could counter the swept-wing Soviet MiG-15 in high-speed dogfights in the skies of the Korean War (1950–1953), fighting some of the earliest jet-to-jet battles. Considered one of the best and most important fighter aircraft in that war, the F-86 is also rated highly in comparison with fighters of other eras. Although it was developed in the late 1940s and was outdated by the end of the 1950s, the Sabre proved versatile and adaptable and continued as a front-line fighter in numerous air forces.

Its success led to an extended production run of more than 7,800 aircraft between 1949 and 1956, in the United States, Japan, and Italy. In addition, 738 carrier-modified versions were purchased by the US Navy as FJ-2s and FJ-3s. Variants were built in Canada and Australia. The Canadair Sabre added another 1,815 aircraft and the significantly redesigned CAC Sabre (sometimes known as the Avon Sabre or CAC CA-27), had a production run of 112. The Sabre is by far the most-produced Western jet fighter, with a total production of all variants at 9,860 units.

== Development ==
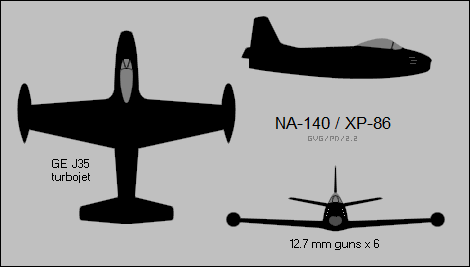
Straight-wing NA-140/XP-86

North American Aviation had produced the propeller-powered P-51 Mustang in World War II, which saw combat against some of the first operational jet fighters. By late 1944, North American proposed its first jet fighter to the U.S. Navy, which became the FJ-1 Fury. It was an unexceptional transitional jet fighter that had a straight wing derived from the P-51. Initial proposals to meet a United States Army Air Forces (USAAF) requirement for a medium-range, single-seat, high-altitude, jet-powered day escort fighter/fighter bomber were drafted in mid-1944. In early 1945, North American Aviation submitted four designs. The USAAF selected one design over the others and granted North American a contract to build three examples of the XP-86 ("experimental pursuit"). Deleting specific requirements from the FJ-1 Fury, coupled with other modifications, allowed the XP-86 to be lighter and considerably faster than the Fury, with an estimated top speed of 582 mph (937 km/h), versus the Fury's 547 mph (880 km/h). Despite the gain in speed, early studies revealed the XP-86 would have the same performance as its rivals, the XP-80 and XP-84. Because these rival designs were more advanced in their development stages, North American feared that the XP-86 would be cancelled.

Crucially, the XP-86 was not able to meet the required top speed of 600 mph (970 km/h); North American had to quickly devise a radical change that could leapfrog its rivals. The F-86 was the first American aircraft to take advantage of flight-research data seized from the German aerodynamicists at the end of World War II. These data showed that a thin, swept wing could greatly reduce drag and delay compressibility problems that had bedeviled fighters such as the Lockheed P-38 Lightning when approaching the speed of sound. By 1944, German engineers and designers had established the benefits of swept wings based on experimental designs dating back to 1940. A study of the data showed that a swept wing would solve their speed problem, while a slat on the wing's leading edge that extended at low speeds would enhance low-speed stability.

Because development of the XP-86 had reached an advanced stage, the idea of changing the sweep of the wing was met with resistance from some senior North American staff. Despite stiff opposition, after good results were obtained in wind tunnel tests, the swept-wing concept was eventually adopted. Performance requirements were met by incorporating a 35° swept-back wing using modified NACA four-digit airfoils, NACA 0009.5–64 at the root and NACA 0008.5–64 at the tip, with an automatic slat design based on that of the Messerschmitt Me 262 and an electrically adjustable stabilizer, another feature of the Me 262A. Many Sabres had a "6–3 wing" (a fixed leading edge with a 6-inch extended chord at the root and a 3-inch extended chord at the tip) retrofitted after combat experience was gained in Korea. This modification changed the wing airfoils to the NACA 0009-64 modified configuration at the root and the NACA 0008.1–64 mod at the tip.

The XP-86 prototype, which led to the F-86 Sabre, was rolled out on 8 August 1947. The first flight occurred on 1 October 1947 with George Welch at the controls, flying from Muroc Dry Lake (now Edwards AFB), California.

The United States Air Force's (USAF) Strategic Air Command had F-86 Sabres in service from 1949 through 1950. They were assigned to the 22nd Bomb Wing, the 1st Fighter Wing, and the 1st Fighter Interceptor Wing. The F-86 was the primary U.S. air combat fighter during the Korean War, with significant numbers of the first three production models seeing combat.

The F-86 Sabre was also produced under license by Canadair, Ltd, as the Canadair Sabre. The final variant of the Canadian Sabre, the Mark 6, is generally rated as having the highest capabilities of any Sabre version. (Note: Quote: "The Canadair Sabre Mk 6 was the last variant and considered to be the 'best' production Sabre ever built.")

=== Breaking sound barrier and other records ===
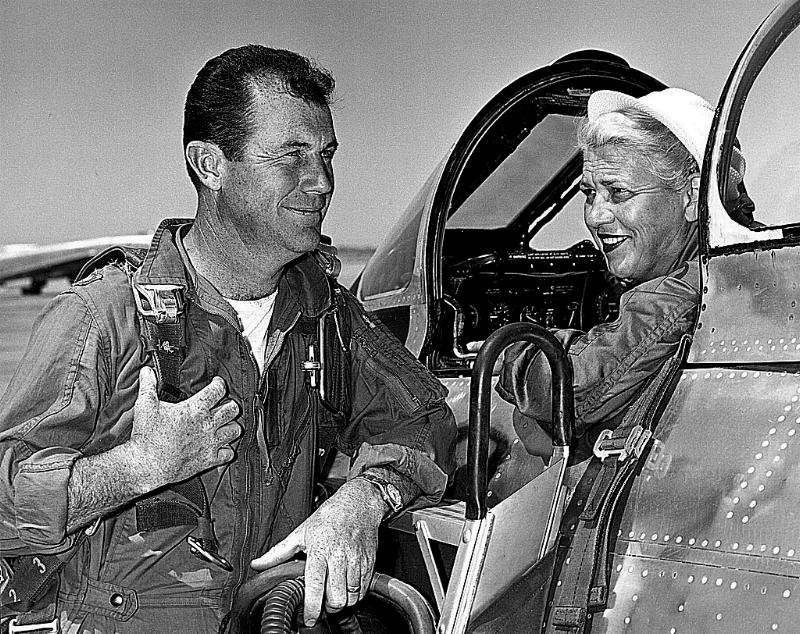
Jackie Cochran in the cockpit of the Canadair Sabre with Chuck Yeager

The F-86A set its first official world speed record of 671 miles per hour (1,080 km/h) on 15 September 1948, at Muroc Dry Lake, flown by Major Richard L. Johnson, USAF. Five years later, on 18 May 1953, Jacqueline Cochran became the first woman to break the sound barrier, flying a "one-off" Canadian-built F-86 Sabre Mk 3, alongside Chuck Yeager. Col. K. K. Compton won the 1951 Bendix air race in an F-86A with an average speed of 553.76 mph (891.19 km/h).

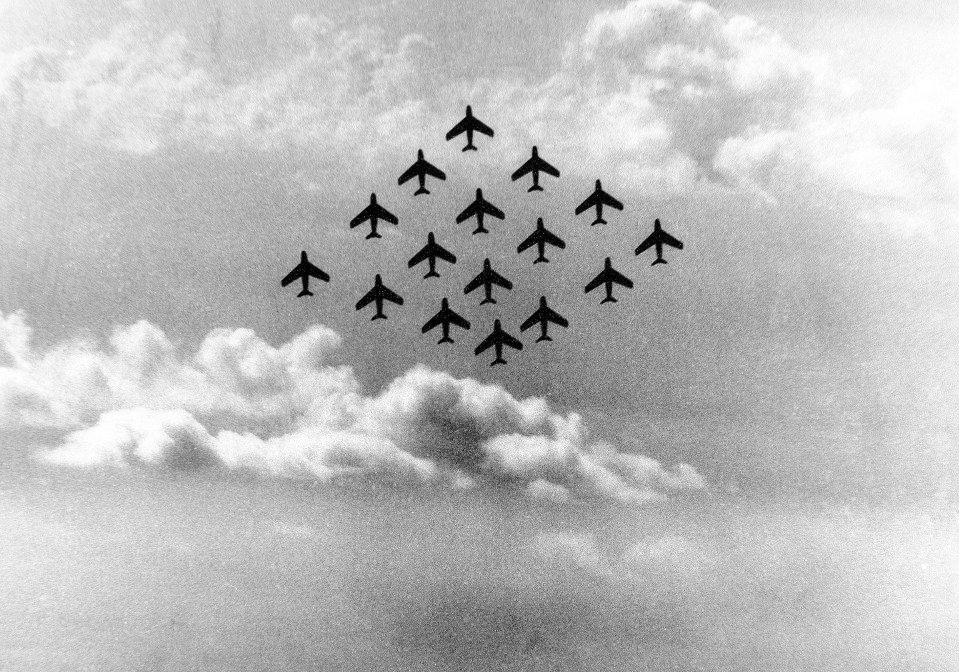
PAF "Falcons" make a world record in 1958 with 16 F-86s.

On 2 February 1958, a team of Pakistan Air Force F-86 Sabres called "Falcons" set a world record at PAF Base Masroor by performing a loop while in a 16 aircraft diamond formation. The team was led by then-Wing Commander Zafar Masud.

== Design ==
=== Overview ===
The F-86 was produced as both a fighter-interceptor and fighter-bomber. Several variants were introduced over its production life, with improvements and different armament implemented (see below). The XP-86 was fitted with a General Electric J35-C-3 jet engine that produced 4,000 lbf (18 kN) of thrust. This engine was built by GM's Chevrolet division until production was turned over to Allison. The General Electric J47-GE-7 engine was used in the F-86A-1 producing a thrust of 5,200 lbf (23 kN), while the General Electric J73-GE-3 engine of the F-86H produced 9,250 lbf (41 kN) of thrust.

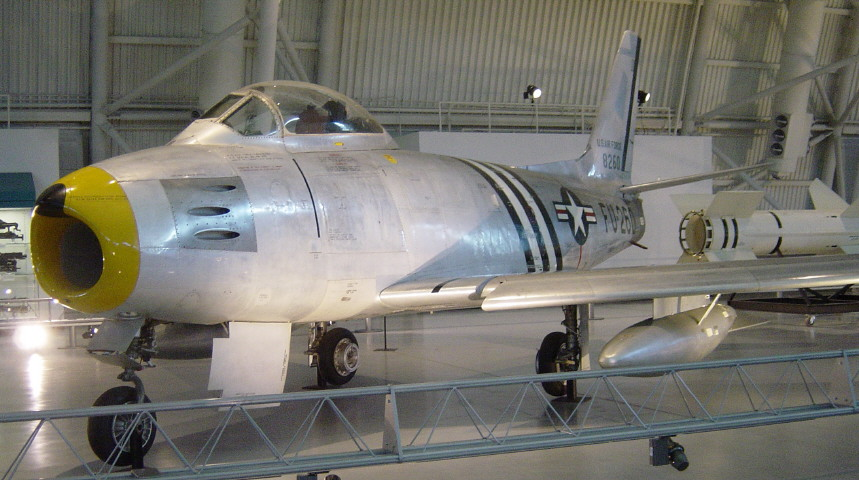
F-86 Sabre at the National Air and Space Museum in livery of 4th Fighter-Interceptor Wing

The fighter-bomber version (F-86H) could carry up to 2,000 lb (910 kg) of bombs, including an external fuel-tank type that could carry napalm. Unguided 2.75-inch (70-millimeter) rockets were used on some fighters on training missions, but 5-inch (127 mm) rockets were later carried on combat operations. The F-86 could also be fitted with a pair of external jettisonable jet fuel tanks (four on the F-86F beginning in 1953) that extended the range of the aircraft. Both the interceptor and fighter-bomber versions carried six 0.50 in (12.7 mm) M3 Browning machine guns with electrically boosted feed in the nose (later versions of the F-86H carried four 20 mm (0.79 in) cannons instead of machine guns). Firing at a rate of 1,200 rounds per minute, the 0.50 in (12.7 mm) guns were harmonized to converge at 1,000 ft (300 m) in front of the aircraft, using armor-piercing (AP) and armor-piercing incendiary (API) rounds, with one API tracer for every five AP or API rounds. The API rounds used during the Korean War contained magnesium, which were designed to ignite upon impact, but burned poorly above 35,000 ft (11,000 m) as oxygen levels were insufficient to sustain combustion at that height. Initial planes were fitted with the Mark 18 manual-ranging, computing gun sight. The last 24 F-86A-5-Nas and F-86Es were equipped with the A-1CM gunsight-AN/APG-30 radar, which used radar to automatically compute a target's range, which later proved to be advantageous against MiG opponents over Korea.

=== Flying characteristics ===
The transition to the Sabre's swept wings and jet engine saw many accidents and incidents, since even experienced pilots had to learn new handling techniques and flying characteristics. Early on in the jet age, some US manufacturers instituted safety and transition programs where experienced test and production pilots toured operational fighter squadrons to provide instruction and demonstrations designed to lower the accident rate.

As F-86 models continued to be upgraded, the learning process continued. Important design changes included switching from an elevator/stabilizer to an all-flying tail, discontinuation of leading-edge slats for a solid wing with a small, forward-mounted wing fence, increased internal fuel capacity, increased engine power, and an internal missile bay (F-86D). While the solid leading edge and increased internal fuel capacity increased combat performance, they exacerbated a dangerous and often fatal handling characteristic; the nose was raised prematurely from the runway during take-off. The danger of over-rotation is now a major area of instruction and concern for current F-86 pilots. The 1972 Sacramento Canadair Sabre accident resulting in 22 fatalities and 28 other casualties was a result of over-rotation on take-off.

== Operational history ==
=== Korean War ===
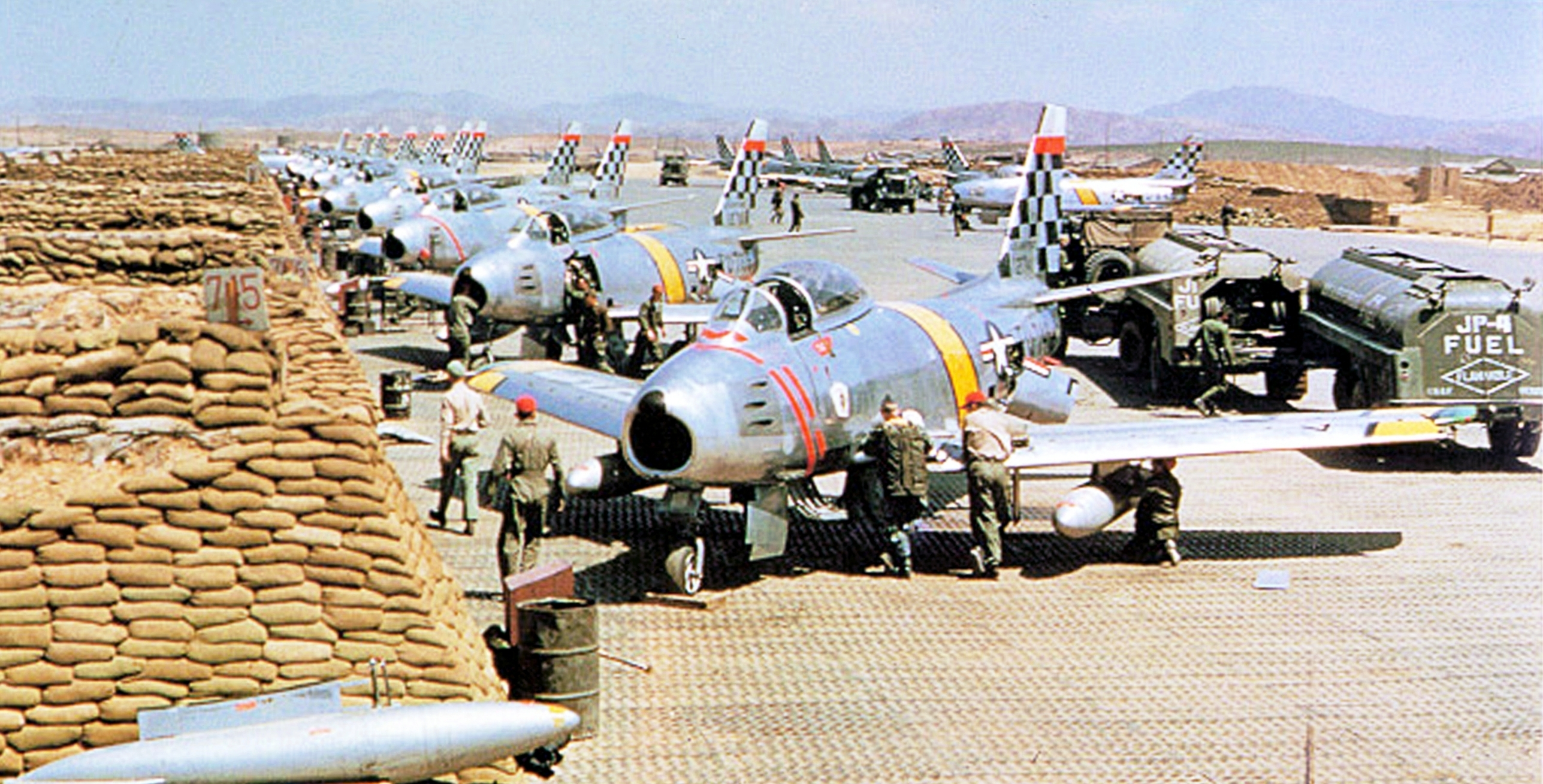
USAF North American F-86 Sabre fighters from the 51st Fighter Interceptor Wing Checkertails are readied for combat during the Korean War at Suwon Air Base.

The F-86 entered service with the USAF in 1949, joining the 1st Fighter Wing's 94th Fighter Squadron and became the primary air-to-air jet fighter used by the Americans in the Korean War. While earlier straight-winged jets such as the P-80 and F-84 initially achieved air victories, when the swept-wing MiG-15 was introduced in November 1950, it outperformed all UN-based aircraft.

==== Introduction of the MiG-15 and comparisons ====
In response, three squadrons of F-86s were rushed to the Far East in December. The MiG-15 was superior to early F-86 models in ceiling, firepower, acceleration, turning, rate of climb, and ability to zoom climb. The F-86 was marginally faster, and could out-dive the MiGs. When the F-86F was introduced in 1953, the two aircraft became more closely matched, and by the end of the war, many American combat-experienced pilots were claiming a marginal superiority for the F-86F.

The heavier firepower of the MiG, and many other contemporary fighters, was addressed by Project Gun-Val, which saw the combat testing of seven F-86Fs, each armed with four 20 mm T-160 cannons (such F-86s were designated as F-86F-2s). Despite being able to fire only two of the four 20 mm cannons at a time, the experiment was considered a success and signaled the end of the decades-long use of the Browning .50 caliber in the air-to-air role.

Although the F-86A could be safely flown through Mach 1, the F-86E's all-moving tailplane greatly improved maneuverability at high speeds. The MiG-15 could not safely exceed Mach 0.92, an important disadvantage in near-sonic air combat. Far greater emphasis had been given to the training, aggressiveness, and experience of the F-86 pilots. American Sabre pilots were trained at Nellis, where the casualty rate of their training was so high, they were told, "If you ever see the flag at full staff, take a picture." Despite rules of engagement to the contrary, F-86 units frequently initiated combat over MiG bases in the Manchurian "sanctuary".

In October 1951, the Soviets managed to recover a downed Sabre, and in their investigation of the type, they concluded that the Sabre's advantage in combat was due to the APG-30 radar gunsight that facilitated accurate fire at longer ranges.

==== Deployment of MiGs and Sabres ====
The needs of combat operations balanced against the need to maintain an adequate force structure in Western Europe led to the conversion of the 51st Fighter-Interceptor Wing from the F-80 to the F-86 in December 1951. Two fighter-bomber wings, the 8th and 18th, converted to the F-86F in the spring of 1953. No. 2 Squadron, South African Air Force also distinguished itself flying F-86s in Korea as part of the 18 FBW.

Wreckage of F-86A Sabre (FU-334 / 49-1334) after being bombed on 17 June 1951

The MiGs flown from bases in Manchuria by Chinese, North Korean, and Soviet VVS pilots were pitted against two squadrons of the 4th Fighter-Interceptor Wing forward-based at K-14, Kimpo, Korea. The North Koreans and their allies periodically contested air superiority in MiG Alley, an area near the mouth of the Yalu River (the boundary between Korea and China) over which the most intense air-to-air combat took place.

On 17 June 1951, at 01:30, Suwon Air Base was bombed by two Polikarpov Po-2 biplanes, which each dropped a pair of fragmentation bombs. One scored a hit on the 802nd Engineer Aviation Battalion's motor pool, damaging some equipment, and two bombs burst on the flightline of the 335th Fighter Interceptor Squadron. One F-86A Sabre (FU-334 / 49-1334) was struck on the wing and began burning, eventually gutting the aircraft. Prompt action by personnel who moved aircraft away from the burning Sabre prevented further loss. Eight other Sabres were damaged in the brief attack, four seriously, and one F-86 pilot was among the wounded. The North Koreans subsequently credited Lt. La Woon Yung with this attack.

==== Evaluations of the success of the F-86 ====
Rare Korean War F-86 gun-camera footage of a MiG-15 shoot-down over Korea

By the end of hostilities, F-86 pilots were initially credited by American sources with having shot down 792 MiGs for a loss of only 78 Sabres in air-to-air combat, a victory ratio of 10:1. Of the 41 American pilots who earned the designation of ace during the Korean War, all but one flew the F-86 Sabre, the exception being a Navy Vought F4U Corsair night-fighter pilot. After the war, though, the USAF reviewed its figures in an investigation code-named Sabre Measure Charlie and downgraded the kill ratio of the North American F-86 Sabre against the Mikoyan-Gurevich MiG-15 by half. Internally, the USAF accepted that its pilots had actually downed about 200 MiGs

Soviet records show only 335 MiG-15s lost in Korea to all causes, including accidents, antiaircraft fire, and ground attacks. Chinese claims of their losses amount to 224 MiG-15s in Korea. North Korean losses are not known, but according to North Korean defectors, their air force lost around 100 MiG-15s during the war. Thus, 659 MiG-15s are admitted as being lost, many of these to F-86 Sabres. The Soviets claimed to have downed over 600 Sabres, together with the Chinese claims (211 F-86s shot-down), although these cannot be reconciled with the number of Sabres recorded as lost by the US.

Suggested reasons for the F-86's success include the fact that many of the American pilots were experienced World War II veterans, while the North Koreans and the Chinese lacked combat experience, but United Nations pilots suspected many of the MiG-15s were being flown by experienced Soviet pilots, who also had combat experience in World War II. Former Communist sources now acknowledge Soviet pilots initially flew the majority of MiG-15s that fought in Korea, but they also dispute that more MiG-15s than F-86s were shot down in air combat. Later in the war, North Korean and Chinese pilots increased their participation as combat flyers.

The status of many claimed air-to-air victories in the Korean War has been increasingly debated as more data become available, showing that instances of over-claiming abounded on both sides. The research by Dorr, Lake, and Thompson claimed an F-86 kill ratio closer to 2:1. A recent RAND report made reference to "recent scholarship" of F-86 vs. MiG-15 combat over Korea and concluded that the actual kill:loss ratio for the F-86 was 1.8:1 overall, and likely closer to 1.3:1 against MiGs flown by Soviet pilots. However, this ratio did not count the number of aircraft of other types (including the B-29, A-26, F-80, F-82, F-84, and Gloster Meteor) shot down by MiG-15 pilots.

Data-matching with Soviet records suggests that US pilots routinely attributed their own combat losses to "landing accidents" and "other causes". According to official US data ("USAF Statistical Digest FY1953"), the USAF lost 224 F-86 fighters in Korea. Of these, 184 were lost in combat (78 in air-to-air combat, 19 by antiaircraft guns, 26 were "unknown causes", and 61 were "other losses") and 66 in incidents. South African Air Force lost 6 F-86s in the war. This gives 256 confirmed F-86 losses during the Korean War.

=== 1958 Taiwan Strait crisis ===
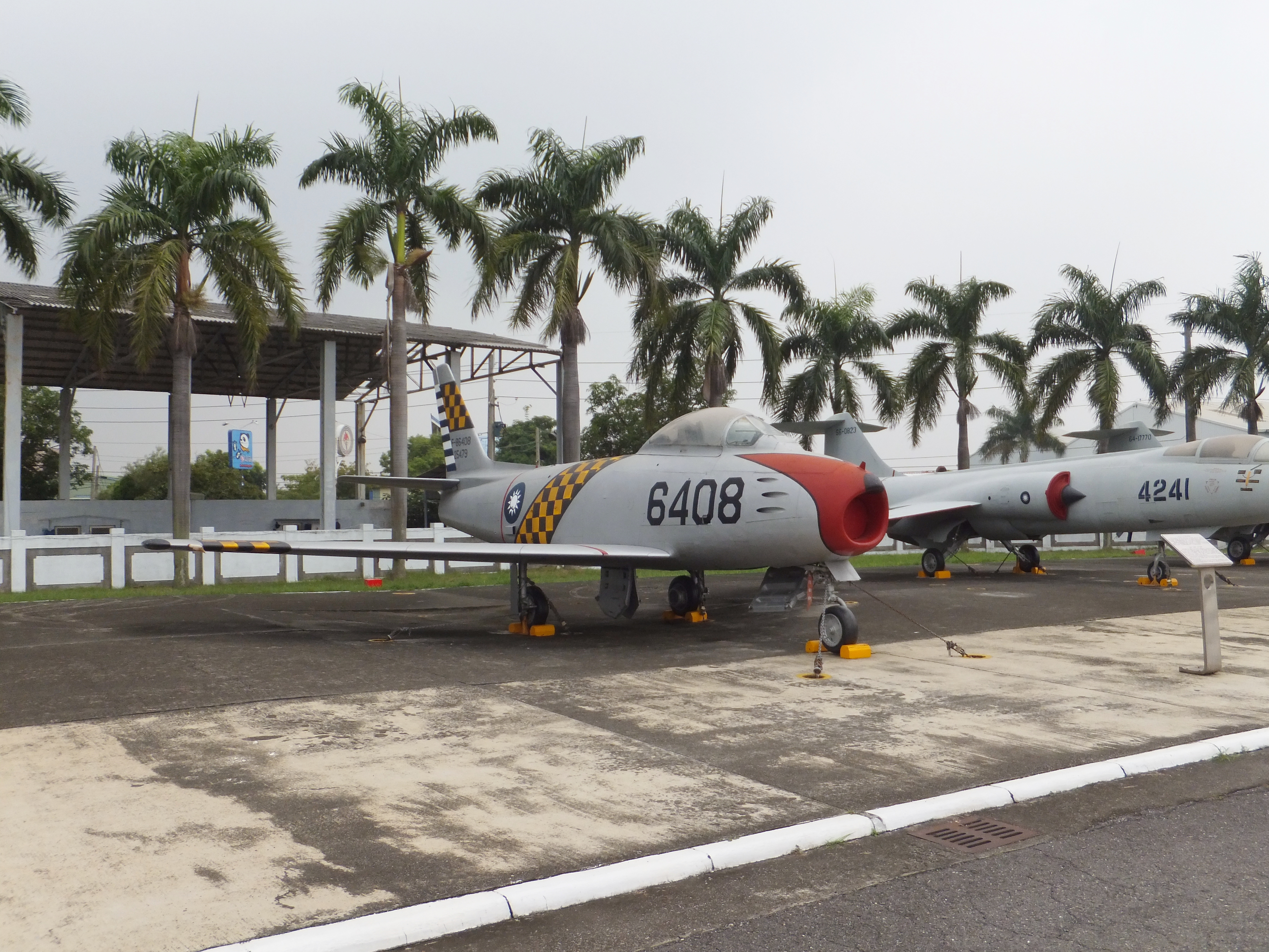
An ROCAF F-86F on display

The Republic of China Air Force was an early recipient of surplus USAF Sabres. From December 1954 to June 1956, the ROC Air Force received 160 ex-USAF F-86F-1-NA through F-86F-30-NA fighters. By June 1958, the Republic of China on Taiwan had built up an impressive fighter force, with 320 F-86Fs and seven RF-86Fs having been delivered.

Sabres and MiGs were shortly to battle each other in the skies of Asia once again in the Second Taiwan Strait Crisis. In August 1958, the Chinese Communists of the People's Republic of China attempted to force the ROC Nationalists off the islands of Quemoy and Matsu by shelling and blockade. ROCAF F-86Fs flying combat air patrol over the islands found themselves confronted by People's Liberation Army Air Force MiG-15s and MiG-17s, and numerous dogfights resulted.

During these battles, the ROCAF Sabres introduced a new element into aerial warfare. Under a secret effort designated Operation Black Magic, the U.S. Navy had provided the ROC with the AIM-9 Sidewinder, its first infrared-homing air-to-air missile, which was just entering service with the United States. A small team from VMF-323, a Marine FJ-4 Fury squadron with later assistance from China Lake and North American Aviation, initially modified 20 of the F-86 Sabres to carry a pair of Sidewinders on underwing launch rails and instructed the ROC pilots in their use flying profiles with USAF F-100s simulating the MiG-17. The MiGs enjoyed an altitude advantage over the Sabres, as they had in Korea, and PLAAF MiGs routinely cruised over the ROCAF Sabres, only engaging when they had a favorable position. The Sidewinder took away that advantage and proved to be devastatingly effective against the MiGs.

=== Pakistan Air Force ===
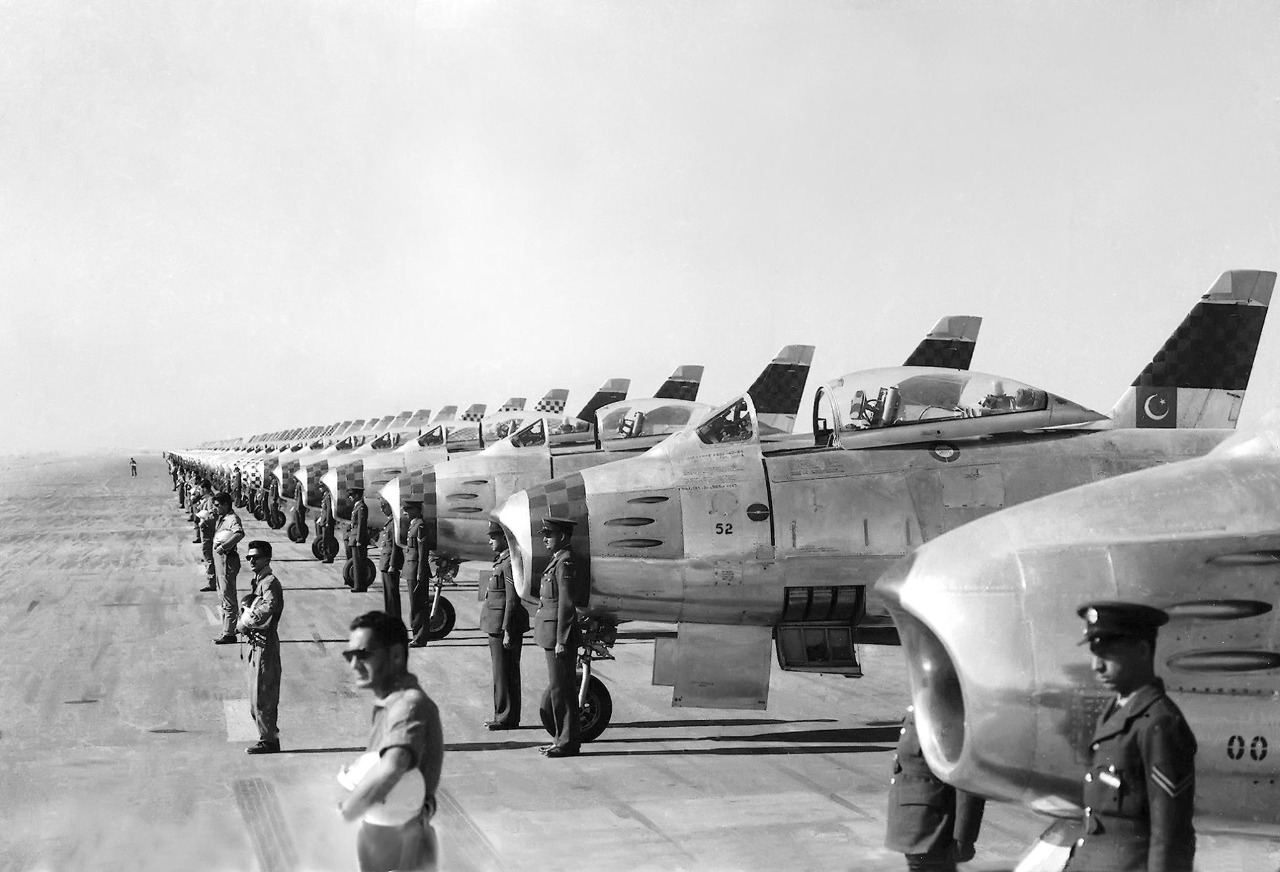
Pakistani Sabres lined up at Masroor Airbase in 1958

In 1954, Pakistan started receiving the first of a total of 102 F-86F Sabres under the Mutual Defense Assistance Program. Many of these aircraft were F-86F-35s from USAF stocks, but some were from the later F-86F-40-NA production block (made specifically for export). Many of the F-35s were brought up to F-40 standards before they were delivered to Pakistan, but a few remained F-35s. The F-86 was operated by nine Pakistan Air Force (PAF) squadrons at various times: Nos. 5, 11, 14, 15, 16, 17, 18, 19, and 26 Squadrons.

Moreover, in April 1959, a PAF F-86F flown by Flight Lieutenant Yunis of the No. 15 Squadron "Cobras" shot down an Indian English Electric Canberra spy plane over Rawalpindi, marking the first aerial victory for the PAF.

In 1966, Pakistan acquired 90 ex-Luftwaffe CL-13 Mk.6s via Iran due to postwar US sanctions. They were known as the F-86E in the PAF, not to be confused with the North American F-86E variants).

The last few of the Sabres were withdrawn from PAF service in 1980 and were replaced with the Shenyang F-6 fighters. In total, Pakistani pilots flew 320,185 hours in the Sabres out of which about 4,500 hours were flown in wartime operations. They are now on display at PAF Museum and various cities around Pakistan.

==== 1960–1961 Bajaur Campaign ====
In late 1960, regular and irregular Afghan forces invaded the Bajaur area of North West Frontier Province in an attempt to annex the region. In response, PAF F-86s were sent to support the Pakistani forces and local Pakistani Pashtun tribesmen who were fighting the Afghan infiltrators. The Sabres also executed bombing runs on Royal Afghan Army positions in Kunar, which were attacking Frontier Corps border posts. Although the Royal Afghan Air Force had seven MiG-17 squadrons and another MiG-21 squadron being operational, no dogfight has been recorded between the two sides.

==== Indo-Pakistani War of 1965 ====
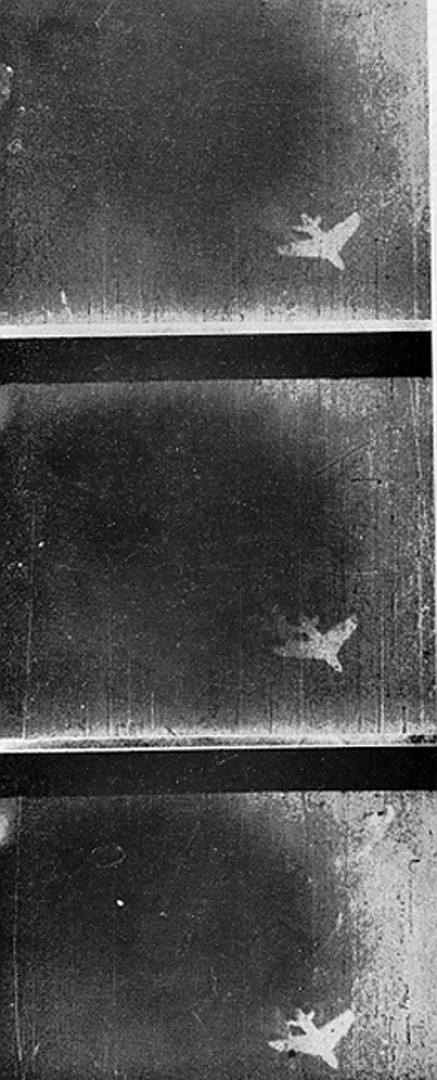
Gun-camera film from Sharbat Ali Changezi's F-86F Sabre of No. 26 Squadron PAF shows the last moments of an IAF Hawker Hunter before being shot down over Lahore District.

The Sabre was no longer a world-class fighter (due to availability of supersonic jets), but various sources state the F-86 gave the PAF a technological advantage in 1965.

- Air to air combat

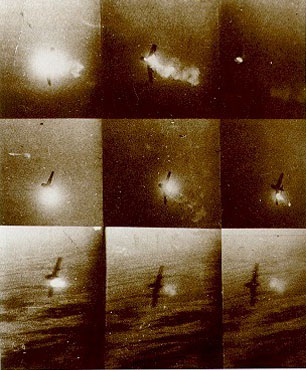
PAF Sabre being shot down by an IAF Folland Gnat in September 1965

In the air-to-air combat of the Indo-Pakistani War of 1965, the PAF Sabres claimed to have shot down 15 Indian Air Force (IAF) aircraft, comprising nine Hunters, four Vampires, and two Gnats. India, however, admitted a loss of 14 combat aircraft to the PAF's F-86s. The F-86s of the PAF had the advantage of being armed with AIM-9B/GAR-8 Sidewinder missiles, whereas none of its Indian adversaries had this capability. Despite this, the IAF claimed that seven F-86 Sabres were shot down by Folland Gnats and six F-86 Sabres were shot down by Hawker Hunters.

- Ground attack

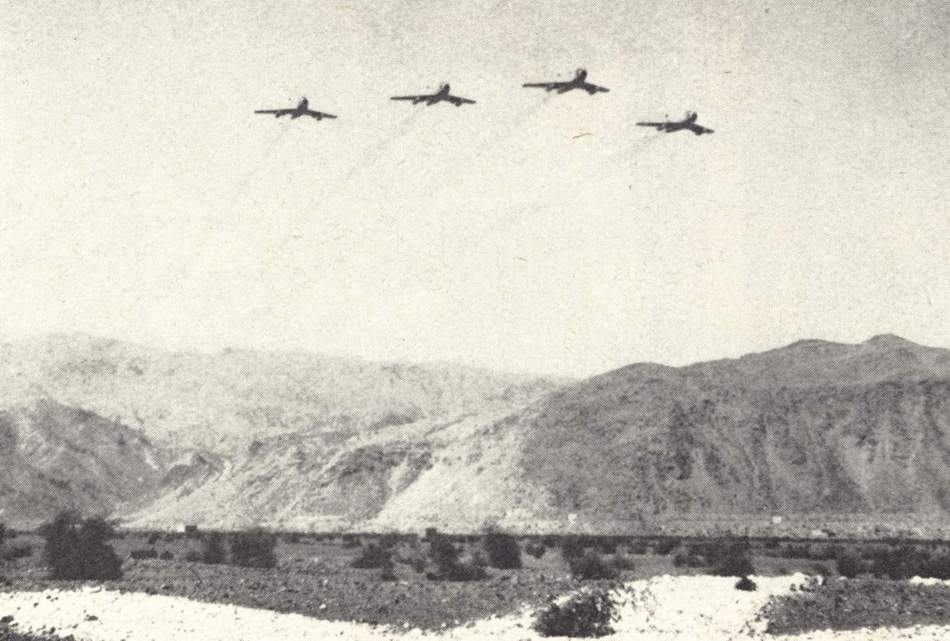
A four-ship Vic formation of PAF F-86F Sabres returning from an interdiction mission in September 1965

The F-86F remained a potent aircraft for use against ground targets. On the morning of 6 September 1965, six F-86s of No. 19 Squadron struck advancing columns of the Indian army using 5-in (127 mm) rockets along with their six .50 in (12.7 mm) M3 Browning machine guns. On the same day, eight F-86 fighters of the same squadron executed airstrikes on the IAF Pathankot. In East Pakistan, F-86s from the No. 14 Squadron struck the Indian airbases of Kalaikunda, Bagdogra, Barrackpore, and Agartala which resulted in the destruction of more than 20 Indian aircraft. The airstrikes on Kalaikunda in particular were highly successful, after which the No. 14 Squadron was nicknamed "Tail Choppers".

In total, Pakistani B-57 Canberras and F-86s destroyed around 39 Indian warplanes on the ground at various IAF airbases. However, India claims losing 22 aircraft on the ground.

==== 1971 Civil conflict and subsequent Indo-Pakistani war ====
- Air-to-air combat

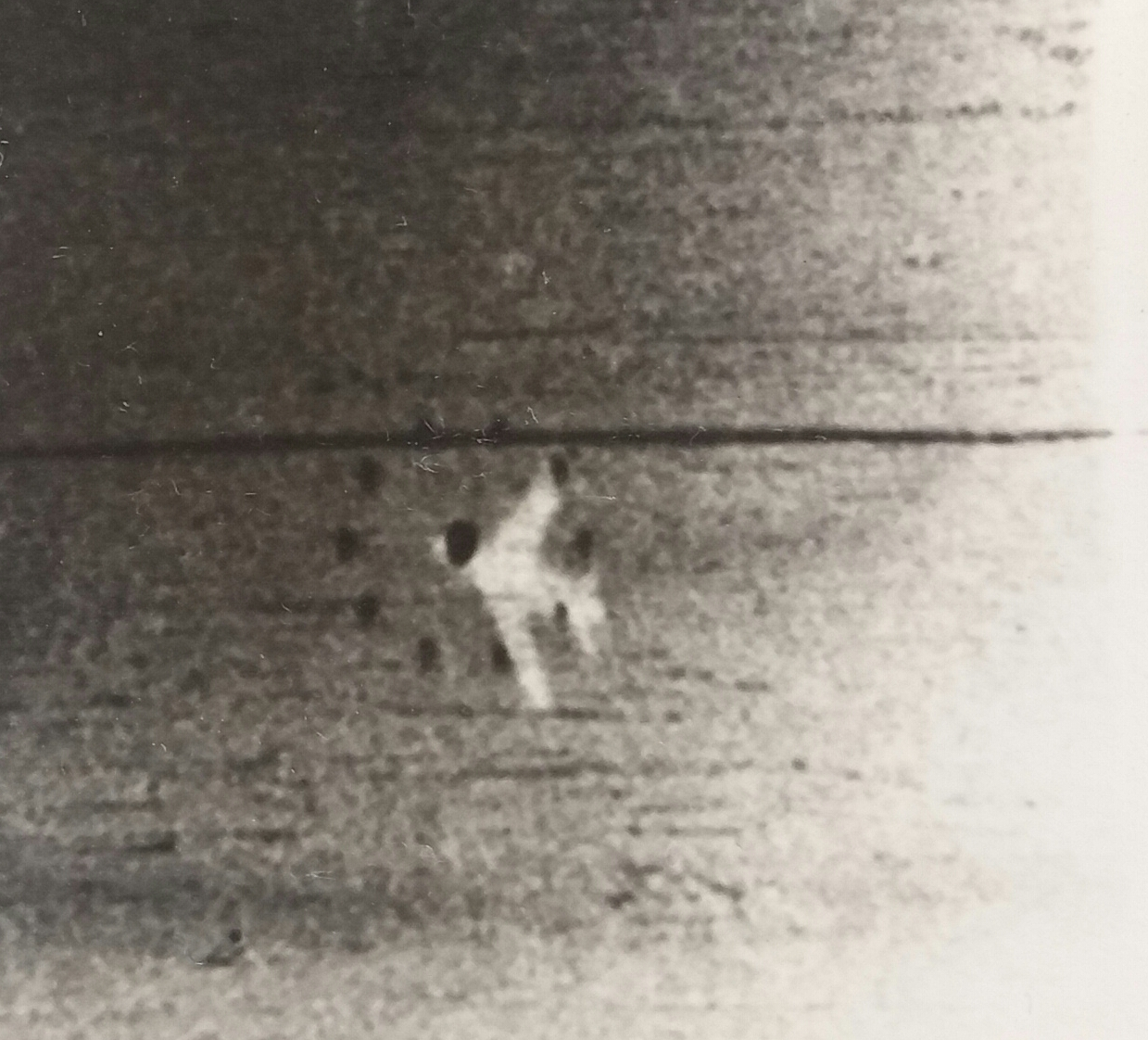
Indian Gnat being shot down by a PAF F-86F of the No. 26 Squadron over Srinagar

The CL-13B Mk.6 Sabres (known as the F-86E in PAF) were the mainstay of the PAF's day-fighter operations during the 1971 War, and had the challenge of dealing with the threat from IAF Folland Gnats, Hawker Hunters, Sukhoi Su-7s, and Mig-21s.

At the beginning of the war, the PAF had eight squadrons of F-86 Sabres. Along with the newer fighter types such as the Mirage III and the Shenyang F-6, the Sabres were tasked with the majority of operations during the war. In East Pakistan, PAF's only Tail Choppers squadron was equipped with 16 F-86Es out of which four were modified to fire AIM-9/GAR-8 missiles.

In the Battle of Boyra, IAF Gnats of 22 Squadron IAF shot down two F-86Es and severely damaged one other.

The PAF F-86s performed well, with Pakistani claims of downing 31 Indian aircraft in air-to-air combat. These included 17 Hawker Hunters, eight Sukhoi Su-7 "Fitters", one MiG 21, and three Gnats, while losing seven F-86s. The most interesting of these was a battle between two Sabres and four MiG-21s. One MiG was shot down, without any Sabres lost. This was achieved due to the greater low-speed performance of the Sabre in comparison to the delta-winged MiG-21.

India, however, claims to have shot down 11 PAF Sabres for the loss of 11 combat aircraft to the PAF F-86s. The IAF numerical superiority overwhelmed the sole East Pakistan Sabres squadron (and other military aircraft) which were either shot down or grounded by Pakistani fratricide as they could not hold out, enabling complete air superiority for the IAF.

- Ground attack

In East Pakistan, the F-86Es of the Tail Choppers took active part in several close air support and counterinsurgency missions against Mukti Bahini militants and irregular Indian forces.

On 15 April 1971, a formation of four Sabres led by Flight Lt. Abbas Khattak strafed and rocketed many rebel strongholds at Bhairab Bazar to support the Pakistan Army's efforts in recapturing food stocks and silos from the Mukti-Bahini militants.

On 26 April 1971, Flight Lt. Abbass led another Sabre formation at Patuakhali, where surviving rebels had regrouped after facing a defeat at Barisal by the Army. The Sabres struck several rebel strongpoints to soften up resistance, after which Special Services Group units were inserted via Mi-8s to clear out the area.

On the Western Front, F-86Es and F-86Fs from various PAF squadrons played a vital role in backing the Pakistan Army's counterattacks at several sectors with air support.

At Shakargarh and Marala sectors, PAF F-86F/Es from the No. 17, No. 18, and 26 Squadrons alongside Shenyang F-6s took part in air-support missions backing Pakistan's I Strike Corps counterattacks against the Indian army's I Corps. Although ill-equipped for antitank roles, the Sabres were modified to carry general-purpose bombs to provide as much effective air support as possible.

In the Battle of Chamb, F-86Fs from No. 26 Squadron "Black Spiders" and F-86Es from No. 18 Squadron supported Iftikhar Janjua's forces in capturing Chumb flying 146 air-support sorties. At one point, the Indian Army suffered a major blow at Akhnur, when Sabres from No. 18 Squadron destroyed their ammunition dumps.

At Sulemanki, F-86Es of No. 17 Squadron "Tigers" flew 55 CAS sorties in support of the IV Corps offensive in which they claimed six Indian tanks and a number of military vehicles destroyed.

At Thar, F-86E and Fs belonging to the No. 19 Squadron struck Indian army positions during their close air support missions. In total, they destroyed eight Indian tanks and several vehicles, while also damaging two military trains.

=== Portuguese Air Force ===
In 1958, the Portuguese Air Force (Força Aérea Portuguesa, FAP) received 50 F-86Fs from ex-USAF stocks. A few former Norwegian Air Force F-86Fs were also purchased as spares in 1968–69.

The FAP deployed some of its F-86F Sabres to Portuguese Guinea in 1961, to guarantee its air defence against possible aggressions from hostile neighboring countries. The aircraft formed the Detachment 52, based at AB2 – Bissalanca Air Base, Bissau. Detachment 52 was initially equipped with eight F-86Fs (serials: 5307, 5314, 5322, 5326, 5354, 5356, 5361, and 5362) from Squadron 51, based at the BA5 – Monte Real Air Base. With the start of the Guinea-Bissau War of Independence in the early 1963, the F-86F were employed in ground-attack and close-support operations against the insurgent forces. In August 1962, 5314 overshot the runway during an emergency landing with bombs still attached on underwing hardpoints and burned out. F-86F 5322 was shot down by enemy ground fire on 31 May 1963; the pilot ejected safely and was recovered. Several other aircraft suffered combat damage but were repaired.

In 1964, the then 16 F-86Fs based at Bissalanca returned to mainland Portugal due to U.S. pressure. They had flown 577 combat sorties, of which 430 were ground-attack and close air-support missions.

=== Philippine Air Force ===
The Philippine Air Force (PhAF) first received the Sabres in the form of F-86Fs in 1957, replacing the North American P-51 Mustang as their primary interceptor. F-86s first operated from Basa Air Base, known infamously as the "Nest of Vipers", where the 5th Fighter Wing of the PhAF was based. Later on in 1960, the PAF acquired the F-86D as their first all-weather interceptor. The most notable use of the F-86 Sabres was in the Blue Diamonds aerobatic display team, which operated eight Sabres until the arrival of the newer, supersonic Northrop F-5. The F-86s were subsequently phased out of service in the 1970s as the F-5 Freedom Fighter and Vought F-8 Crusaders became the primary fighters and interceptors of the PhAF. Antonio Bautista was a Blue Diamonds pilot and a decorated officer. He was killed on 11 January 1974 during a combat sortie against rebels in the south of the country.

=== Indian Air Force ===
Though the Indian Air Force never operated the F-86 Sabre, a small group of IAF pilots trained on the aircraft in the United States in 1963–65 under a brief diplomatic arrangement to provide IAF pilots with Gunnery training. The training contributed to doctrinal exposure rather than operational deployment. During training, Indian pilots would often fly with Pakistani, Iranian and NATO forces. India would instead field the Folland Gnat against the F-86 in conflicts with Saber-armed Pakistan.

=== Soviet Sabre ===
During the Korean War the Soviet search for an intact U.S. F-86 Sabre for evaluation and study purposes was largely frustrated due to the U.S. military's policy of destroying disabled or abandoned weapons and equipment, with USAF pilots destroying most of their downed Sabres by strafing or bombing. One F-86 was downed in a tidal area, and subsequently submerged, preventing its destruction. The aircraft was ferried to Moscow and a new OKB (Soviet Experimental Design Bureau) was established to study the F-86, which later became part of the Sukhoi OKB. "At least one F-86... was sent to the Soviet Union, the Russians [sic] admitted, and other planes and prizes such as U.S. G-suits and radar gun sights also went."

The Soviets studied and copied the optical gunsight and radar from the captured aircraft to produce the ASP-4N gunsight and SRC-3 radar. Installed in the MiG-17, the gunsight system was later used against American fighters in the Vietnam War. (Note: The MiG-17 was a development of the MiG-15 upgraded with a more advanced wing and afterburner (the Sabre's all-flying tail would not be employed until the supersonic MiG-19). The MiG-17 proved to be a deadly foe in Vietnam in the 1960s against more advanced U.S. supersonic opponents; some, such as the F-4 Phantom, actually lacked the guns and radar gunsight introduced by the F-86.) The F-86 studies also contributed to the development of aircraft aluminum alloys such as V-95.

=== Feather Duster ===
The old but nimble MiG-17 had become such a serious threat against the Republic F-105 Thunderchief over North Vietnam that the USAF created project "Feather Duster" to test which tactics supersonic American fighters could use against fighters such as the MiG-17. ANG F-86H units proved to be an ideal stand-in for the Soviet jets. One pilot remarked, "In any envelope except nose down and full throttle", either the F-100 or F-105 was inferior to the F-86H in a dogfight.

== Variants ==
=== North American F-86 ===
Family tree of Sabre & Fury variants

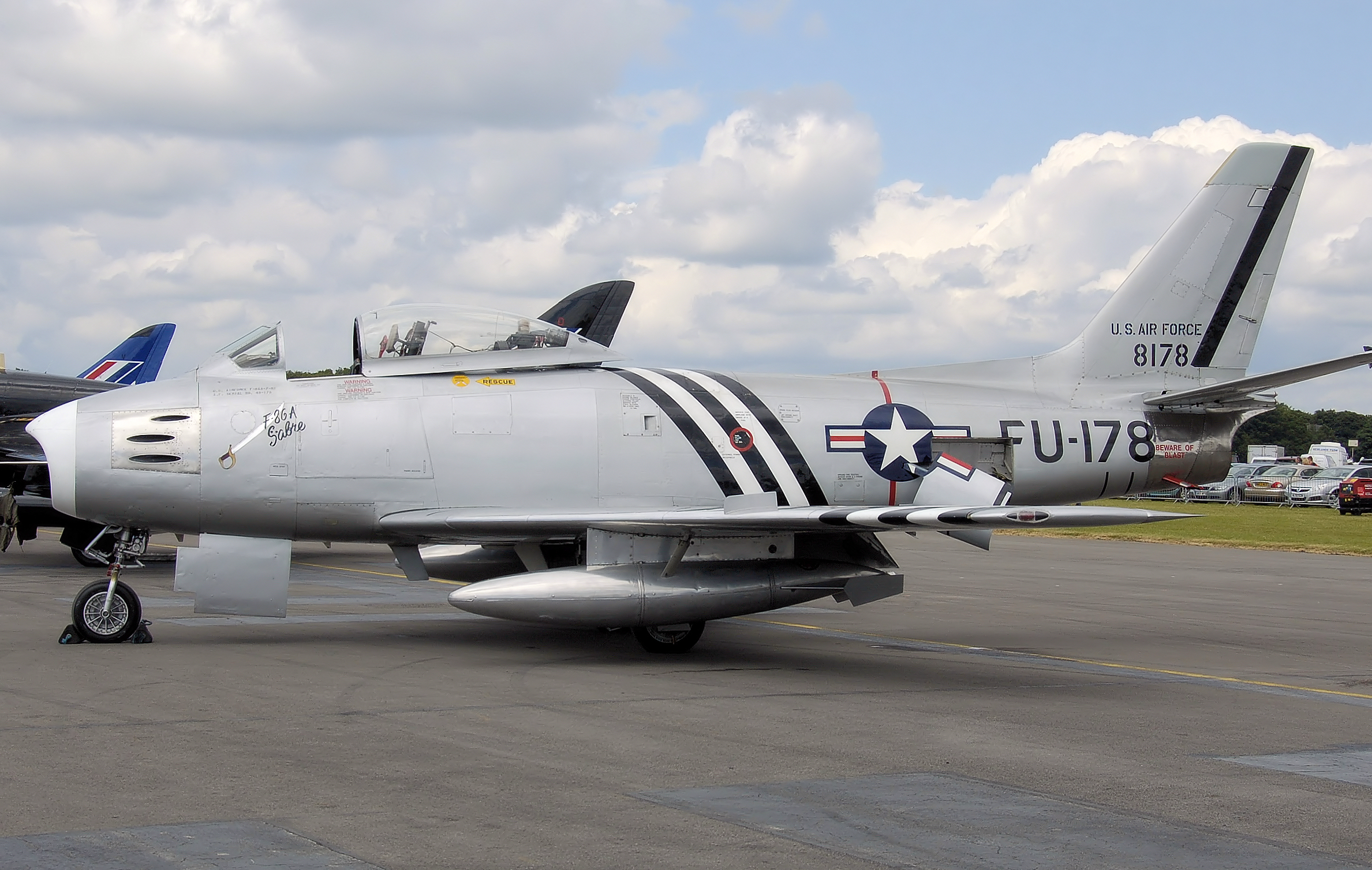
Preserved airworthy F-86A Sabre at Kemble Air Day 2008, England

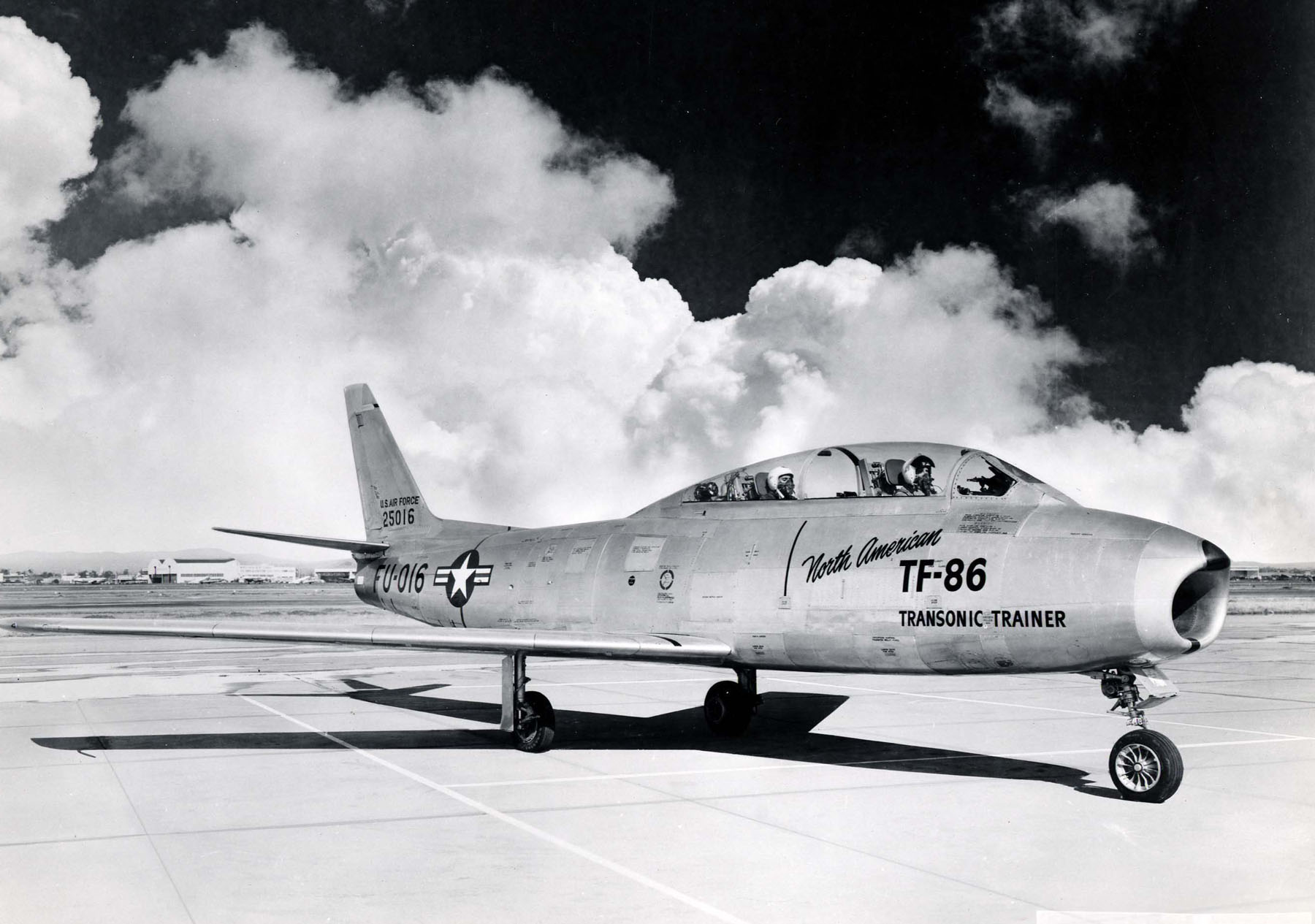
TF-86F

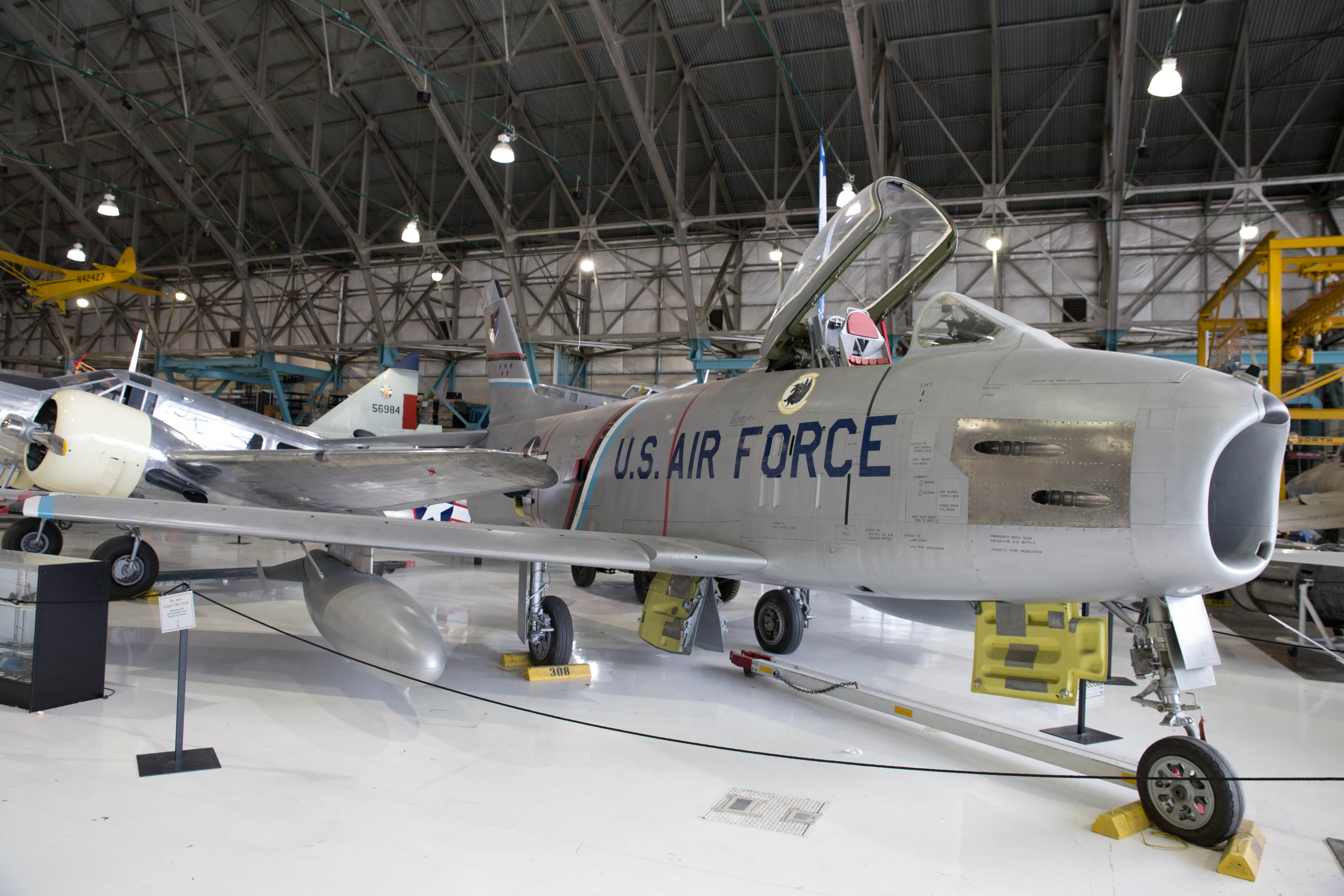
F-86H-10-NH Sabre s/n 53-1308 at the Wings Museum, Denver, Colorado

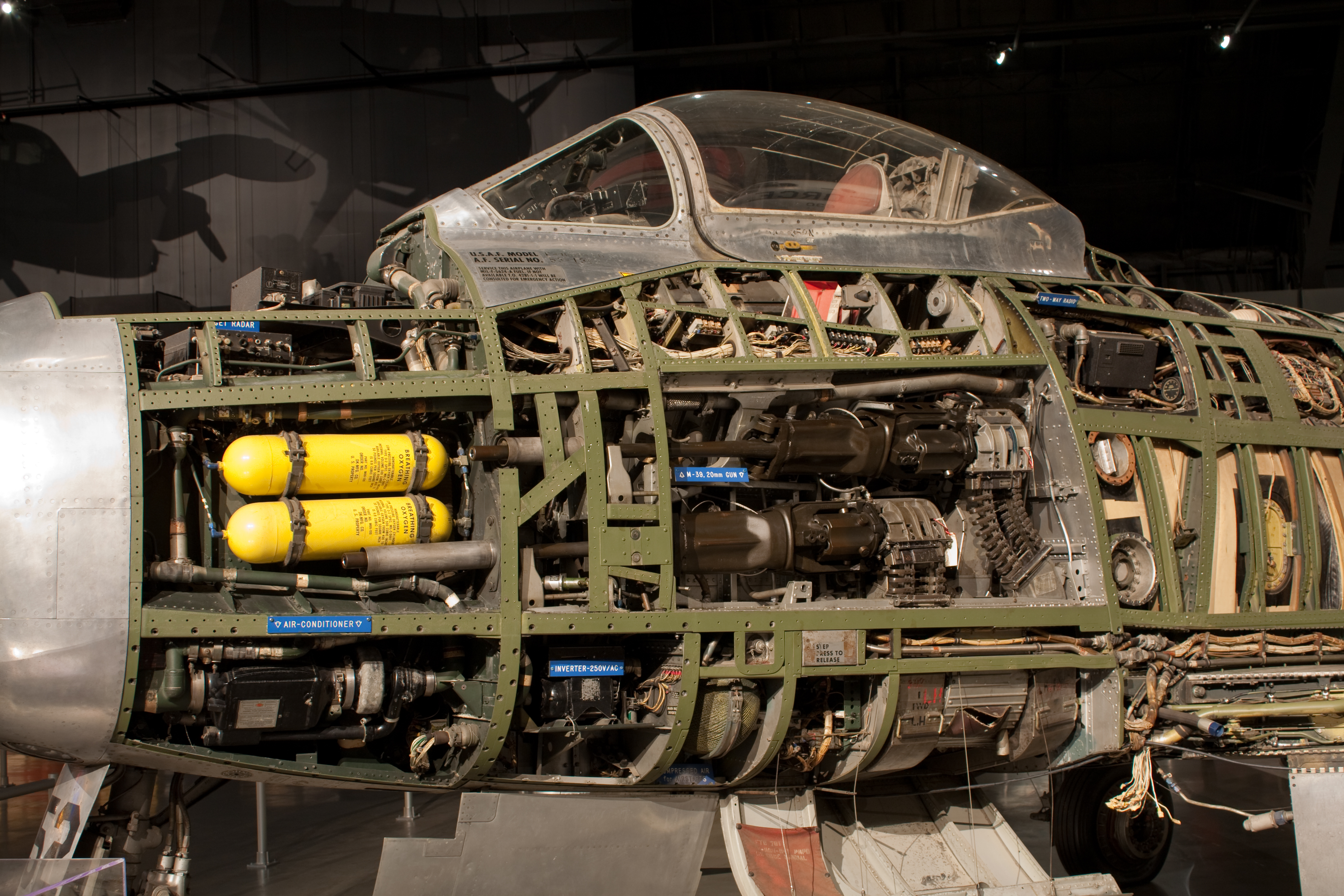
F-86H without skin panels at the National Museum of the United States Air Force

XF-86
three prototypes, originally designated XP-86, North American model NA-140
YF-86A
this was the first prototype fitted with a General Electric J47 turbojet engine.
F-86A
554 built, North American model NA-151 (F-86A-1 block and first order of A-5 block) and NA-161 (second F-86A-5 block)
DF-86A
A few F-86A conversions as drone directors
RF-86A
11 F-86A conversions with three cameras for reconnaissance
F-86B
188 ordered as upgraded A-model with wider fuselage and larger tires but delivered as F-86A-5, North American model NA-152
F-86C
Original designation for the YF-93A, two built, 48–317 & 48–318, order for 118 cancelled, North American model NA-157
YF-95A
Prototype all-weather interceptor, two built, designation changed to YF-86D, North American model NA-164
F-86D/L
Production transonic all-weather search-radar equipped interceptor originally designated F-95A, 2,506 built. The F-86D had only 25 percent commonality with other Sabre variants, with a larger fuselage, larger afterburning engine, and a distinctive nose radome. Sole armament was Mk. 4 unguided rockets instead of machine guns. F-86Ls were upgraded F-86Ds.
F-86E
Improved flight control system and an "all-flying tail" (This system changed to a full power-operated control with an "artificial feel" built into the aircraft's controls to give the pilot forces on the stick that were still conventional, but light enough for superior combat control. It improved high-speed maneuverability); 456 built, North American model NA-170 (F-86E-1 and E-5 blocks), NA-172, essentially the F-86F airframe with the F-86E engine (F-86E-10 and E-15 blocks); 60 of these built by Canadair for USAF (F-86E-6)
F-86E(M)
Designation for ex-RAF Sabres diverted to other NATO air forces
QF-86E
Designation for surplus RCAF Sabre Mk. Vs modified to target drones
F-86F
Uprated engine and larger "6–3" wing without leading-edge slats, 2,239 built; North American model NA-172 (F-86F-1 through F-15 blocks), NA-176 (F-86F-20 and −25 blocks), NA-191 (F-86F-30 and -35 blocks), NA-193 (F-86F-26 block), NA-202 (F-86F-35 block), NA-227 (first two orders of F-86F-40 blocks comprising 280 aircraft that reverted to leading-edge wing slats of an improved design), NA-231 (70 in third F-40 block order), NA-238 (110 in fourth F-40 block order), and NA-256 (120 in final F-40 block order); 300 additional aircraft in this series assembled by Mitsubishi in Japan for Japanese Air Self-Defense Force. Sabre Fs had much improved high-speed agility, coupled with a higher landing speed of over 145 mph (233 km/h). The F-35 block had provisions for a new operational role: the tactical nuclear attack using newer, smaller, and lighter nuclear weapons ("second generation" nuclear ordnance). The F-40 had a new slatted wing with a slightly higher span, resulting in a slight decrease in speed, but also much better agility at both high and low speeds and a reduced landing speed of 124 mph (200 km/h). The USAF upgraded many previous F versions to the F-40 standard. One E and two Fs were modified for improved performance via rocket boost.
F-86F(R)
F-86F-30 (52-4608) had a Rocketdyne AR2-3 with 3,000–6,000 lbf (13,000–27,000 N) thrust at 35,000 ft (11,000 m), giving a top speed of mach 1.22 at 60,000 ft (18,000 m).
F-86F-2
Designation for 10 aircraft modified to carry the M39 cannon in place of the M3 .50 caliber machine gun "six-pack". Four F-86E-10s (serial numbers 51-2803, 2819, 2826 and 2836) and six F-86F-1s (serial numbers 51-2855, 2861, 2867, 2868, 2884 and 2900) were production-line aircraft modified in October 1952 with enlarged and strengthened gun bays, then flight tested at Edwards Air Force Base and the Air Proving Ground at Eglin Air Force Base in November. Eight were shipped to Japan in December and seven forward-deployed to Kimpo Airfield as "Project GunVal" for a 16-week combat field trial in early 1953. Two were lost to engine compressor stalls after ingesting excessive propellant gases from the cannons. (Note: MiG Alley: Sabres Vs. MiGs Over Korea. was researched by North American tech rep John L. Henderson. The aircraft were F-86E-10s: 51-2303, -2819, -2826 and -2836; and F-86F-1's 51-2855, −2862, −2867, −2868, −2884 and −2900.)
QF-86F
About 50 former Japan Self-Defense Forces (JASDF) F-86F aircraft converted to drones for use as targets by the U.S. Navy
RF-86F
Some F-86F-30s converted with three cameras for reconnaissance; also 18 Japan Self-Defense Forces (JASDF) aircraft similarly converted
TF-86F
Two F-86F converted to two-seat training configuration with lengthened fuselage and slatted wings under North American model NA-204
YF-86H
Extensively redesigned fighter-bomber model with deeper fuselage, uprated engine, longer wings and power-boosted tailplane, two built as North American model NA-187
F-86H
Production model, 473 built, with Low Altitude Bombing System (LABS) and provision for nuclear weapon, North American model NA-187 (F-86H-1 and H-5 blocks) and NA-203 (F-86H-10 block)
QF-86H
Target conversion of 29 aircraft for use at United States Naval Weapons Center
F-86J
Single F-86A-5-NA, 49-1069, flown with Orenda turbojet under North American model NA-167 – same designation reserved for A-models flown with the Canadian engines but project not proceeded with
F-86K
F-86L
B.Kh.17
(Thai: บ.ข.๑๗) Royal Thai Air Force designation for the F-86F.

=== North American FJ Fury ===
See: North American FJ-2/-3 Fury for production figures of U.S. Navy versions.

=== CAC Sabre (Australia) ===
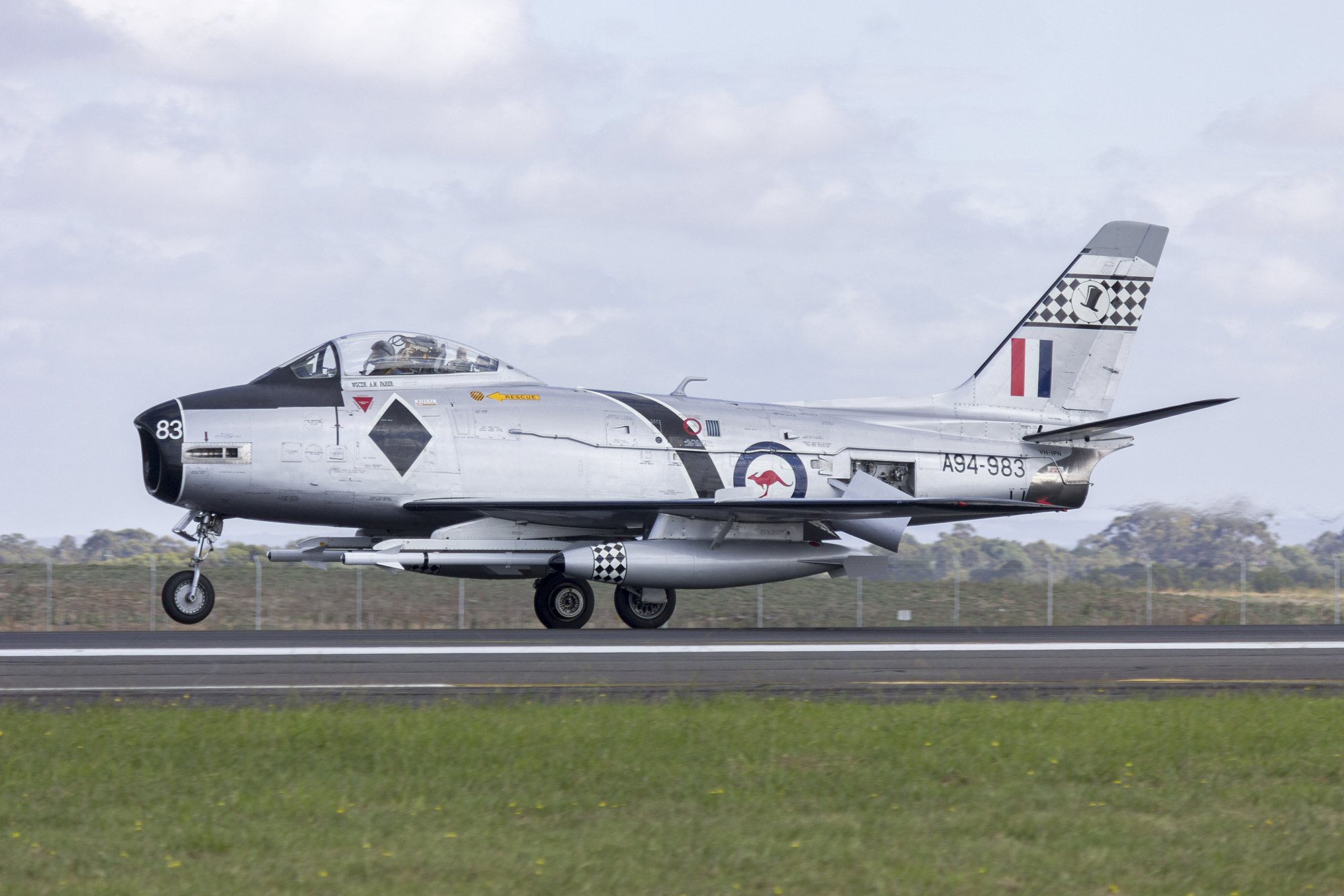
Preserved CAC Sabre Mk 30 in 2018.

Two types based on the U.S. F-86F were built under licence by the Commonwealth Aircraft Corporation (CAC) in Australia, for the Royal Australian Air Force as the CA-26 (one prototype) and CA-27 (production variant). The RAAF operated the CA-27 from 1956 to 1971. The CAC Sabres included a 60% fuselage redesign, to accommodate the Rolls-Royce Avon Mk 26 engine, which had roughly 50% more thrust than the J47, as well as 30 mm Aden cannon and AIM-9 Sidewinder missiles. As a consequence of its powerplant, the Australian-built Sabres are commonly referred to as the Avon Sabre. CAC manufactured 112 of these aircraft. Ex-RAAF Avon Sabres were operated by the Royal Malaysian Air Force (TUDM) between 1969 and 1972. From 1973 to 1975, 23 Avon Sabres were donated to the Indonesian Air Force (TNI-AU); five of these were ex-Malaysian aircraft.

CA-27 marques:

- Mk 30: 21 built, wing slats, Avon 20 engine.
- Mk 31: 21 built, 6–3 wing, Avon 20 engine.
- Mk 32: 69 built, four wing pylons, F-86F fuel capacity, Avon 26 engine.

=== Canadair Sabre ===
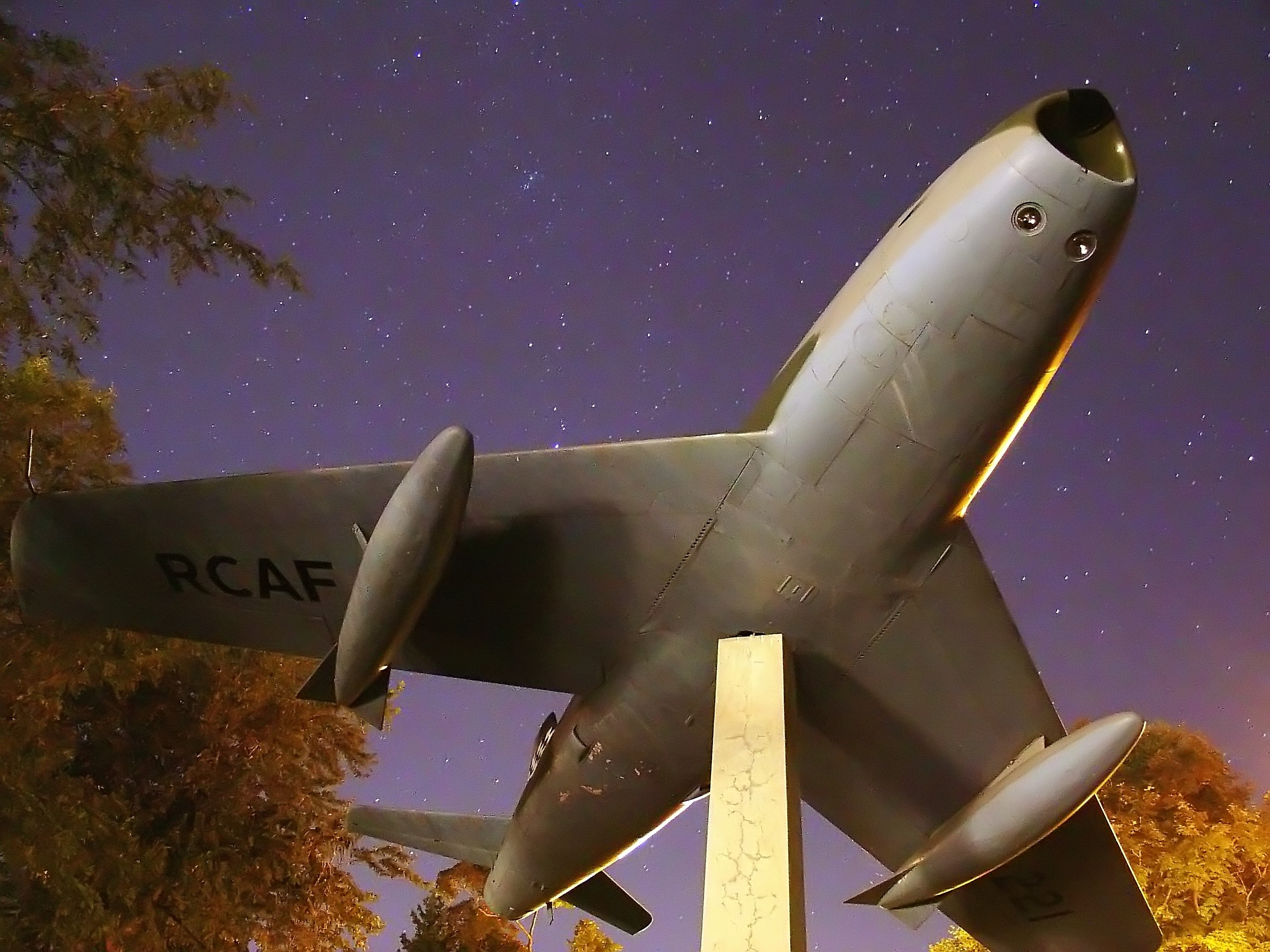
F-86 Sabre monument at the Royal Military College of Canada in Kingston, Ontario

The F-86 was also manufactured by Canadair in Canada as the CL-13 Sabre to replace its de Havilland Vampires, with the following production models:

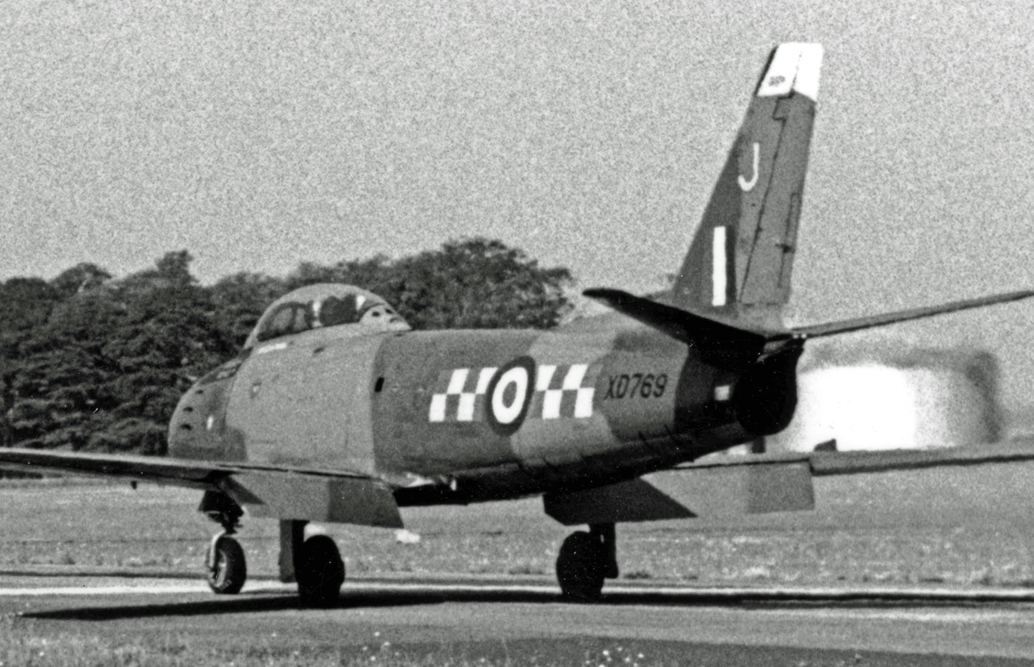
Canadair Sabre F.4 of 92 Squadron RAF Fighter Command in 1955

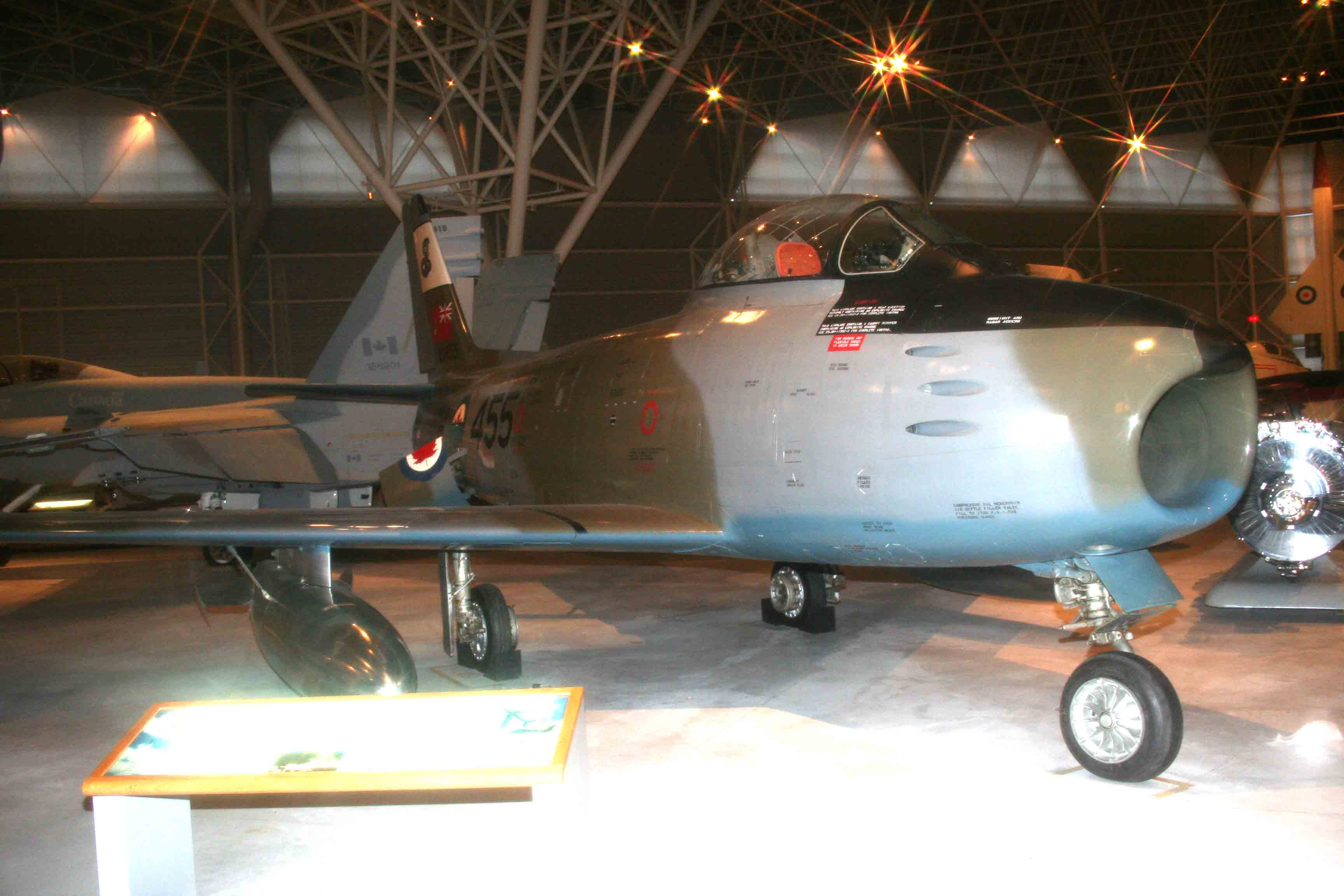
Preserved Canadair Sabre 6

Sabre Mk.1
One built, prototype based on F-86A-5 with 5,200 lbf (23,000 N) (static thrust) GE J47-GE-13 engine.
Sabre Mk.2
350 built, based on F-86E with all flying tailplane and with GE J47-GE-13 engine.

287 built for the RCAF, 60 for the USAF as the F-86E-6, and three to RAF, .

Sabre Mk.3
One built in Canada as a test-bed for the 6,000 lbf (27,000 N) (static thrust) Orenda 3 jet engine, with structural modifications to fit the larger diameter Orenda.
Sabre Mk.4
438 built with extensive detail modifications from Mk.2.

Ten built for the RCAF, and 428 to RAF as the Sabre F.4.

Sabre Mk.5
370 built with more powerful 6,355 lbf (28,270 N) (static thrust) Orenda 10 engine and "6-3" extended leading edges.

370 built for RCAF, from which 75 were later passed on to the German Air Force.

Sabre Mk.5A
Mk.5 in which radar and gunsights were replaced with ballast.
Sabre Mk.6
655 built with 7,275 lbf (32,360 N) Orenda 14 (static thrust).

390 built for the RCAF, 225 for the German Air Force, six to Colombia and 34 to South Africa.

=== Production summary ===
Sabre/Fury production
Manufacturer	Number built
North American Aviation	F-86: 6,297; F3: 1,115
Canadair	1,815
Commonwealth Aircraft Corporation	112
Fiat	221
Mitsubishi	300
Total Sabre/Fury	9,860

=== Production costs ===
	1950 United States dollars						
	F-86A	F-86D	F-86E	F-86F	F-86H	F-86K	F-86L
Program R&D cost	4,707,802	—N/a	—N/a	—N/a	—N/a	—N/a	
Airframe	101,528	191,313	145,326	140,082	316,360	334,633	—N/a
Engine	52,971	75,036	39,990	44,664	214,612	71,474	—N/a
Electronics	7,576	7,058	6,358	5,649	6,831	10,354	—N/a
Armament	16,333	69,986	23,645	17,669	27,573	20,135	—N/a
Ordnance	—N/a	419	4,138	3,047	17,117	4,761	—N/a
Flyaway cost	178,408	343,839	219,457	211,111	582,493	441,357	343,839
Maintenance cost per flying hour	—N/a	—N/a	135	451	—N/a	—N/a	187

== Operators ==
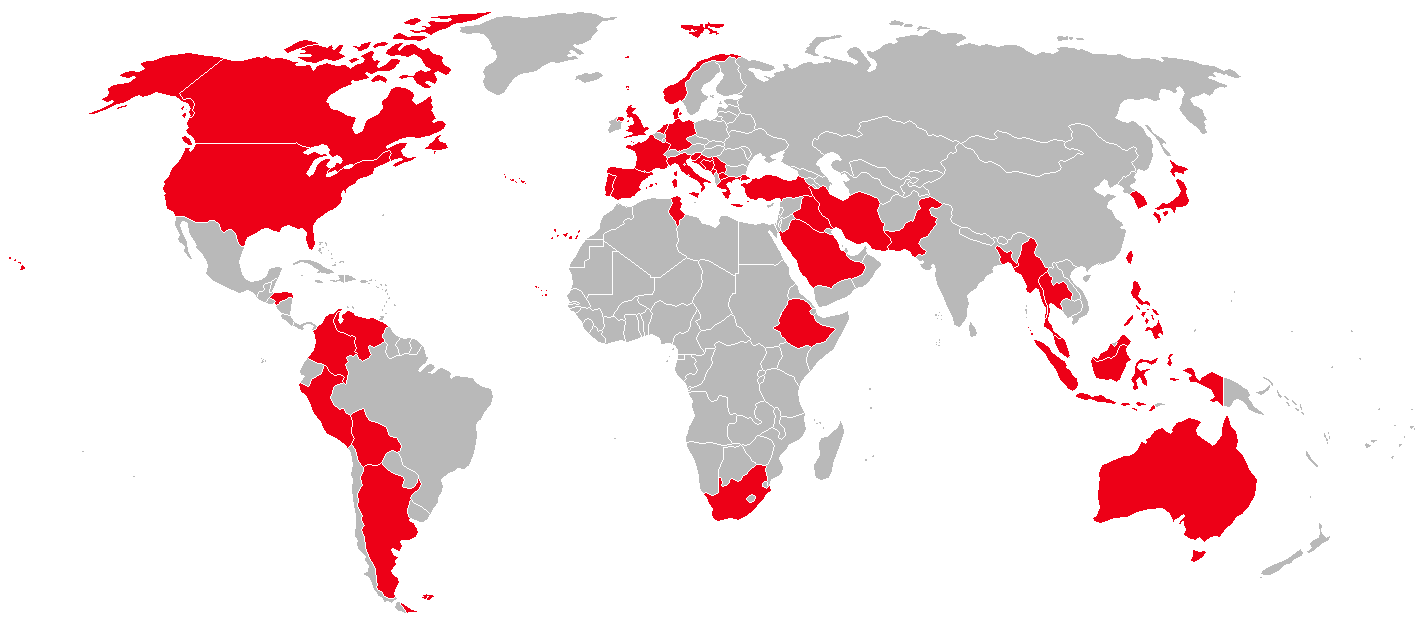
Former Sabre operators, including operators of the CAC and Canadair Sabres

Source: F-86 Sabre Jet: History of the Sabre and FJ Fury

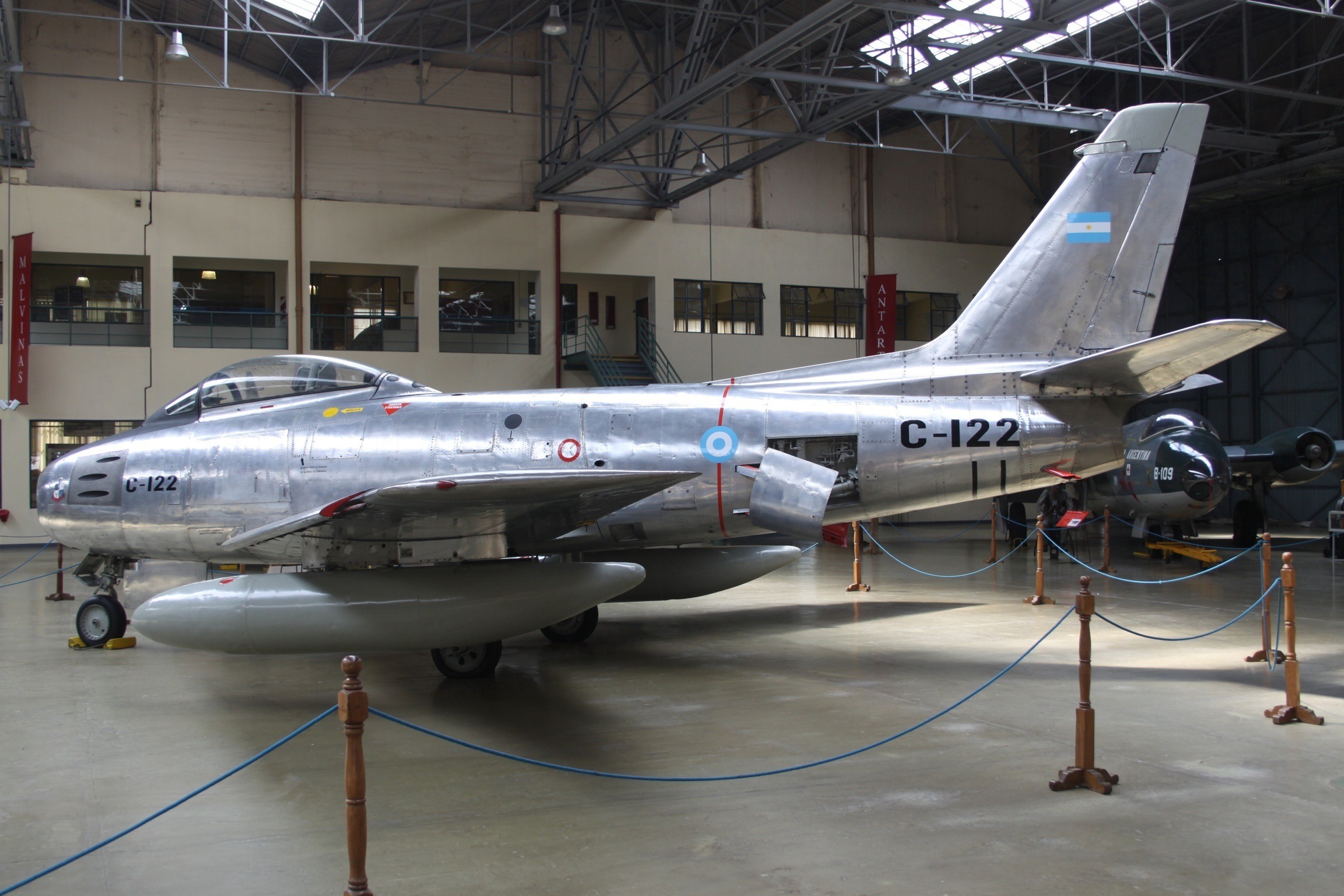
F-86F-30 of the Argentine Air Force, National Aeronautics Museum, Buenos Aires, Argentina

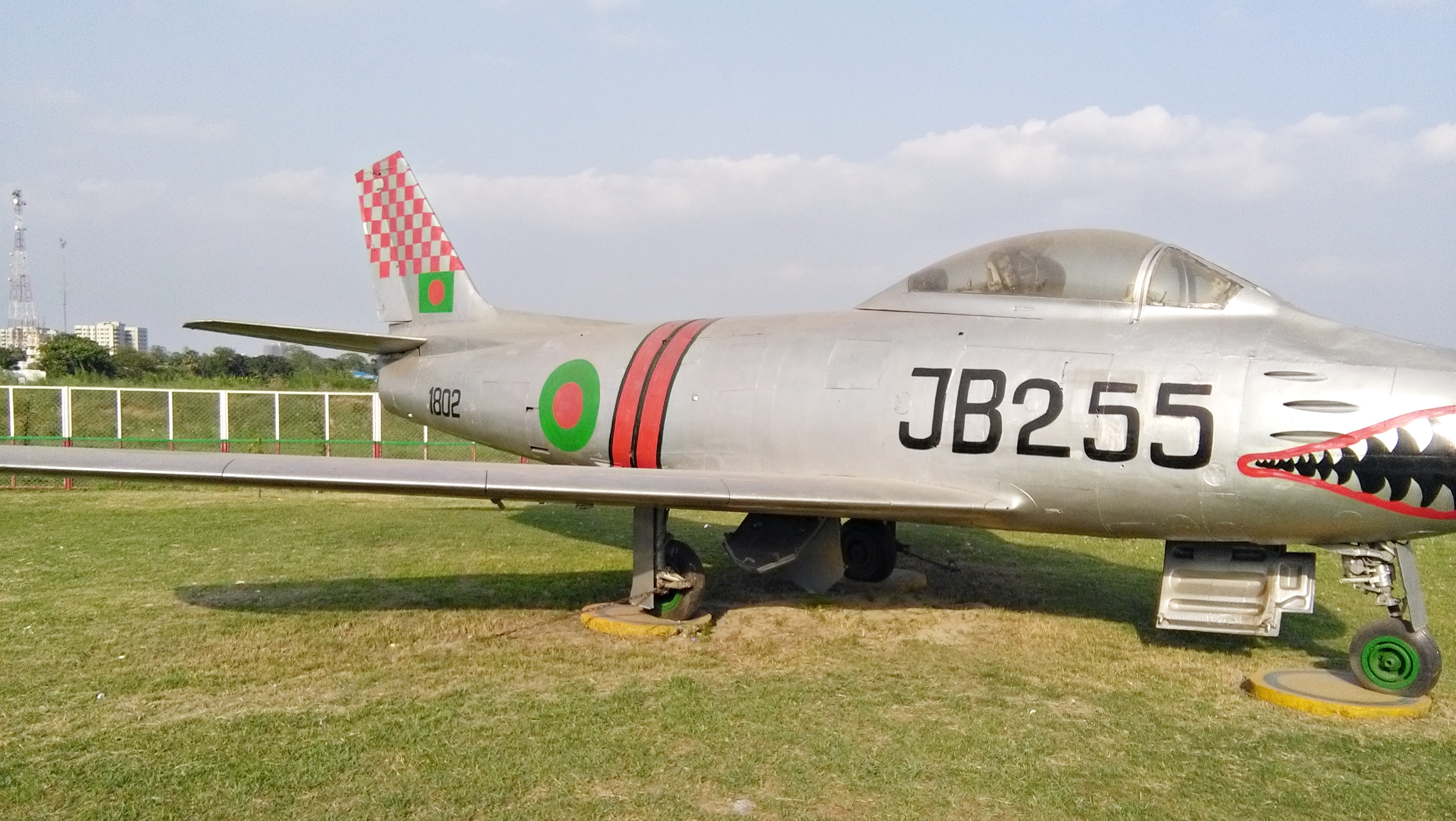
BAF F-86 Sabre in the BAF Museum

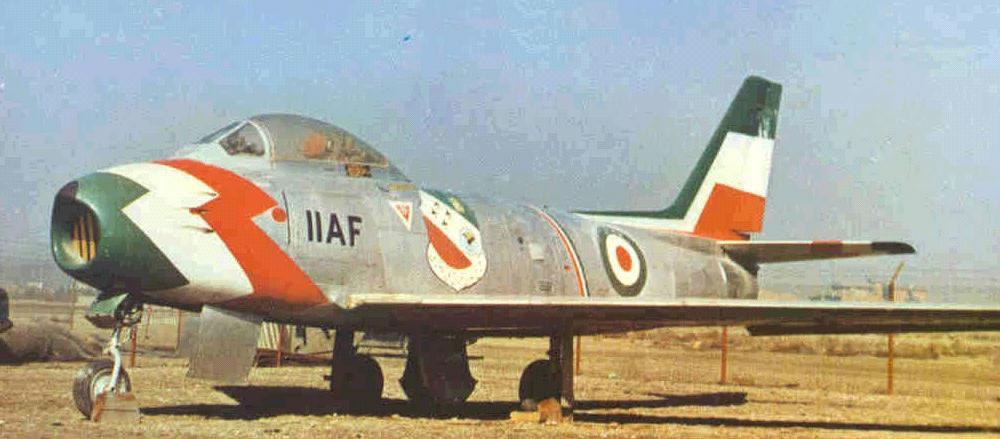
An F-86 Sabre from the Golden Crown aerobatic display team, of the Imperial Iranian Air Force.

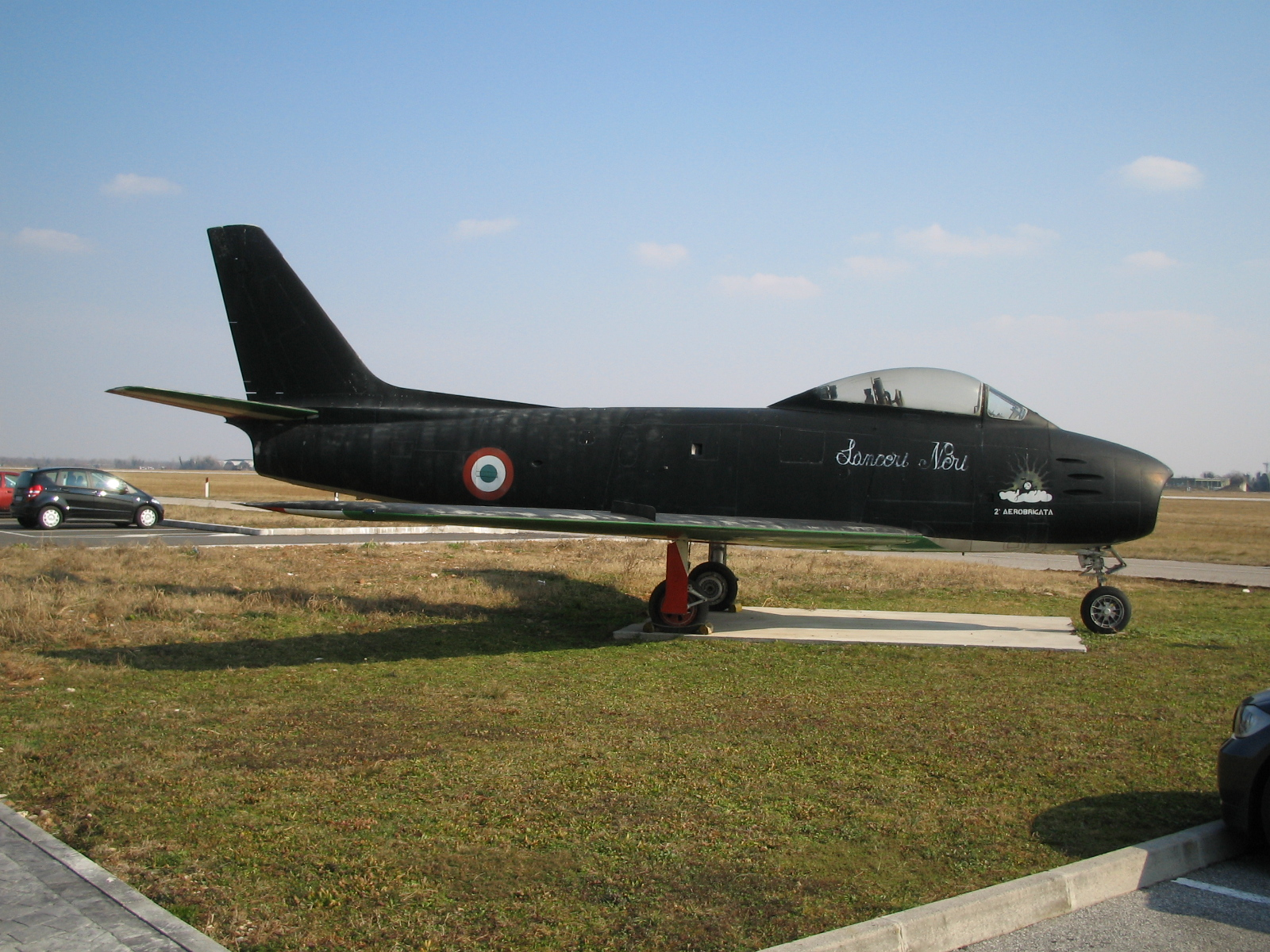
F-86 Sabre of Italian Air Force

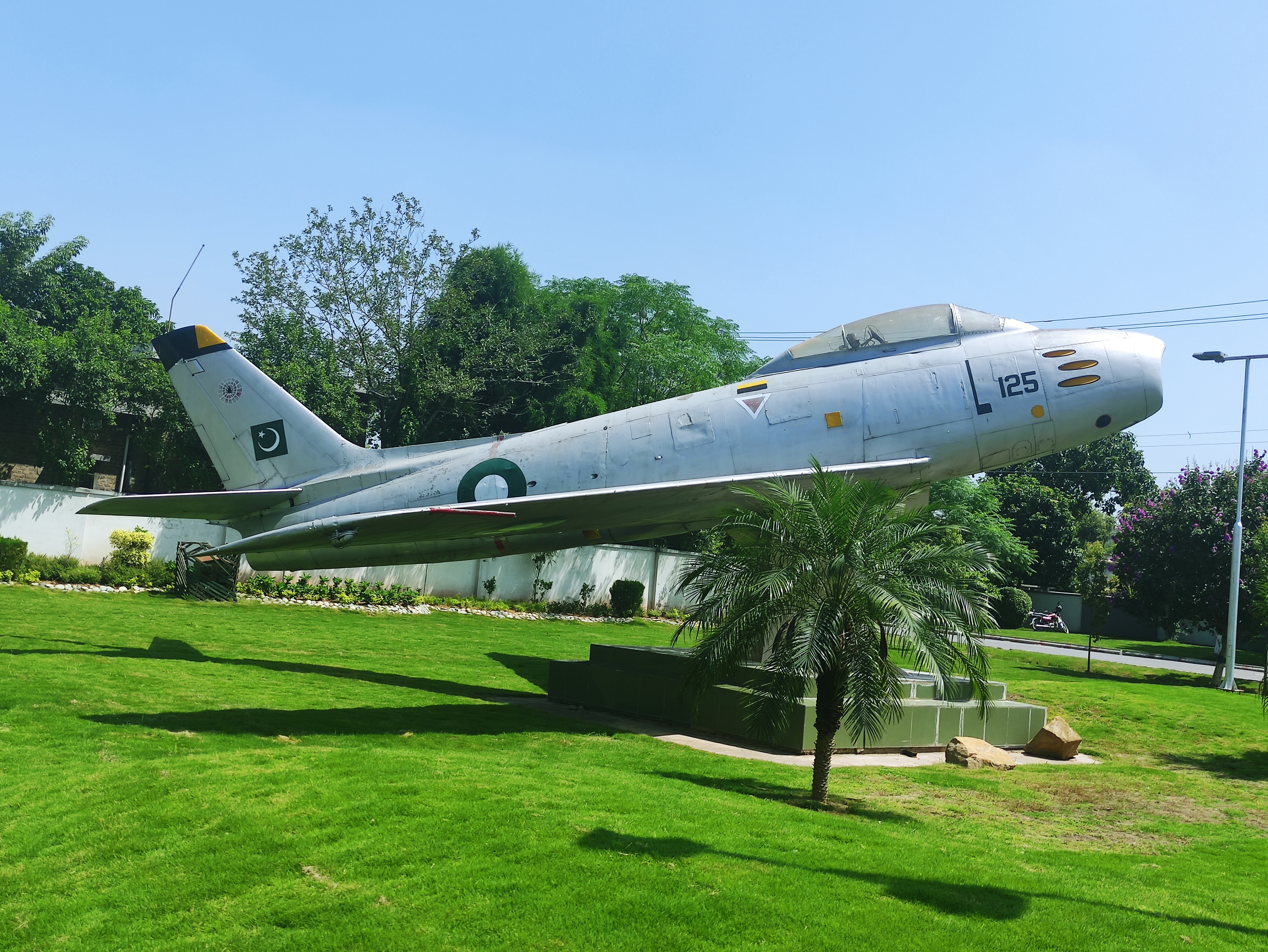
A retired Pakistan Air Force F-86F Sabre from the No. 26 Squadron "Black Spiders" on display at Nur Khan Airbase

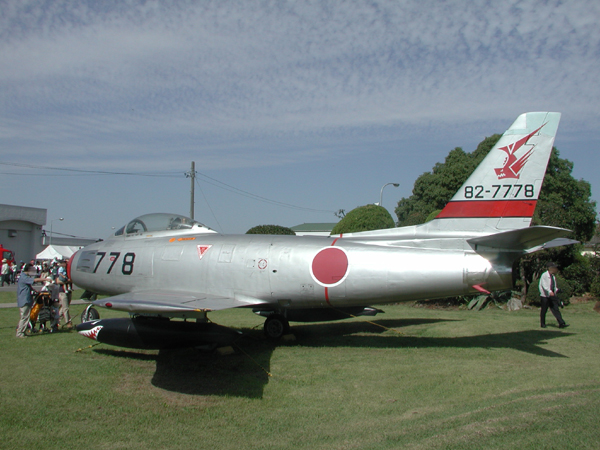
Displayed JASDF's F-86F Kyokukō at Komatsu AB.

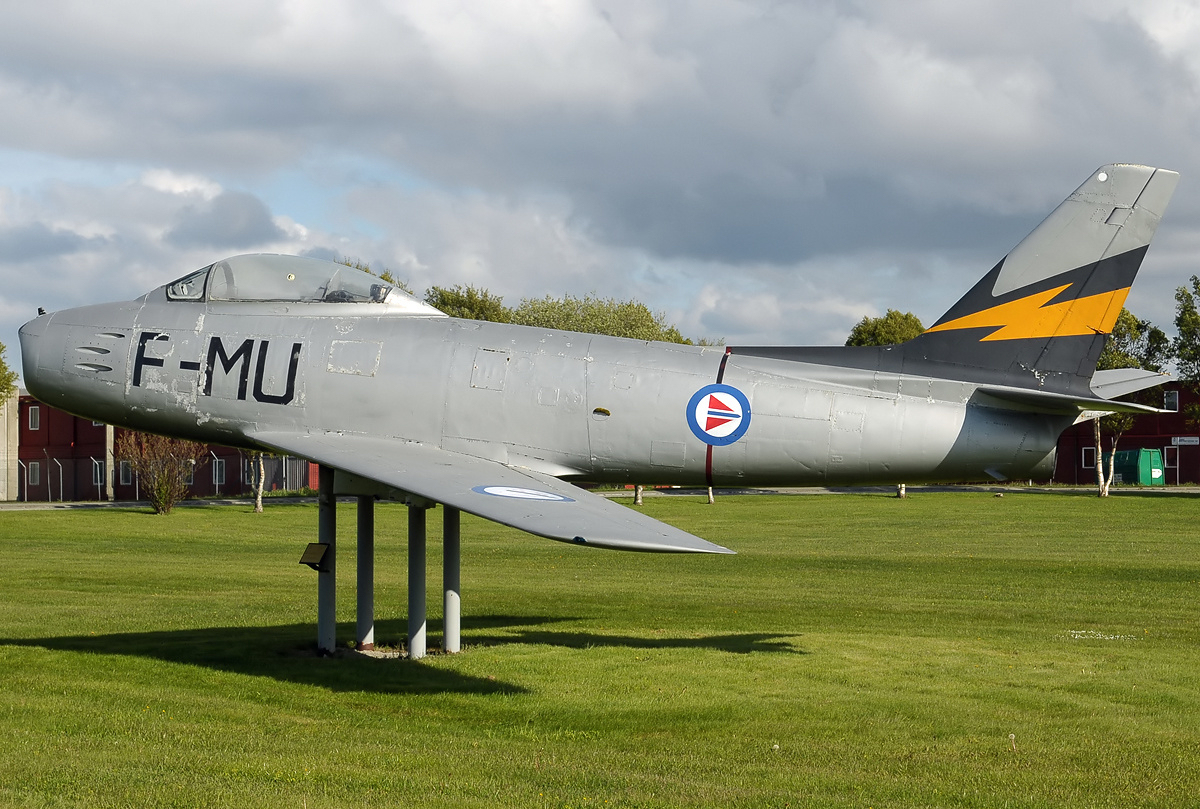
Royal Norwegian Air Force North American F-86F Sabre

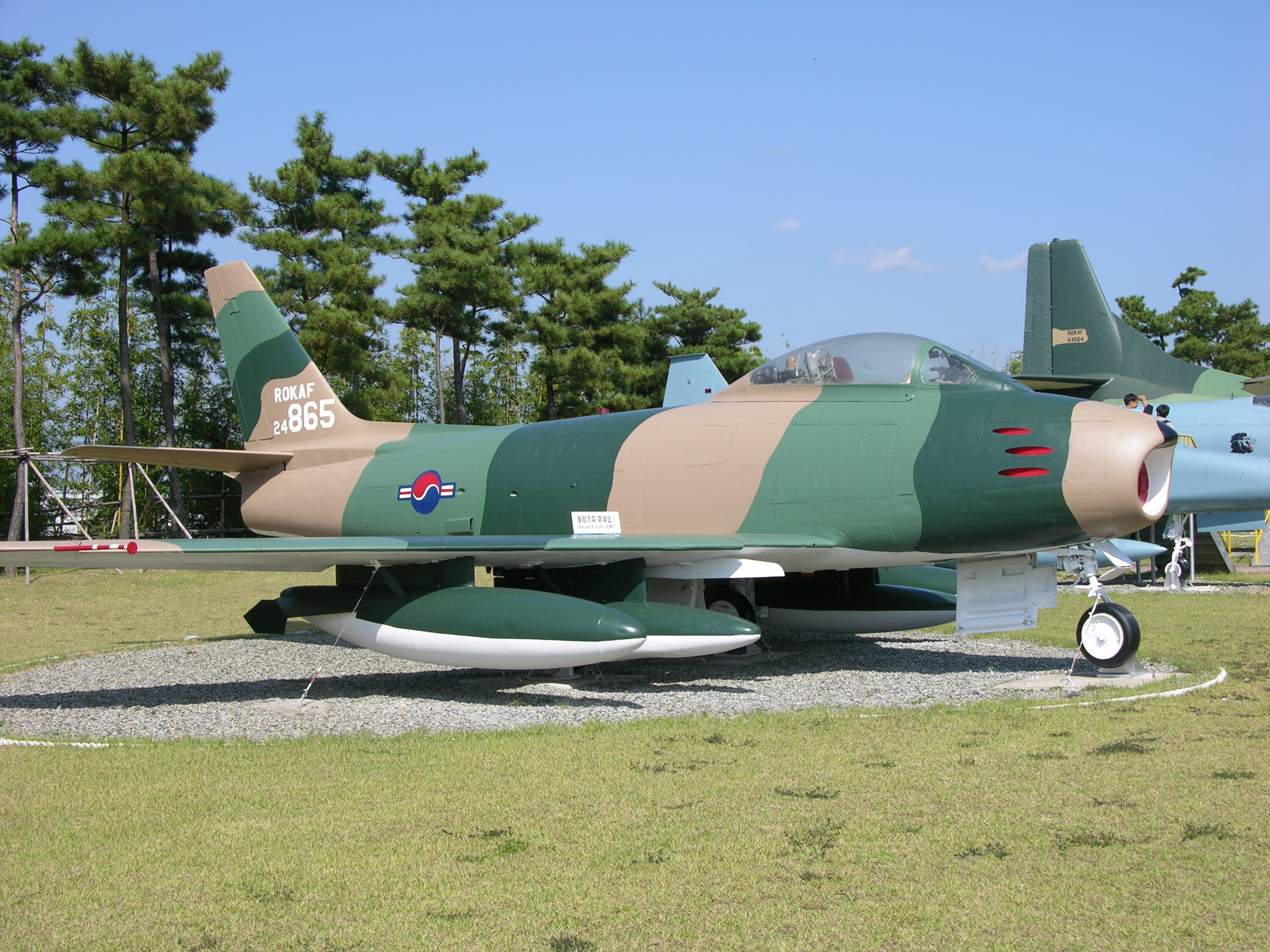
F-86 Republic of Korea Air Force

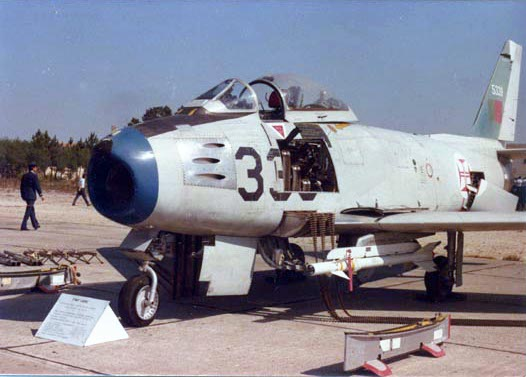
Portuguese F-86F displayed at Monte Real Air Base

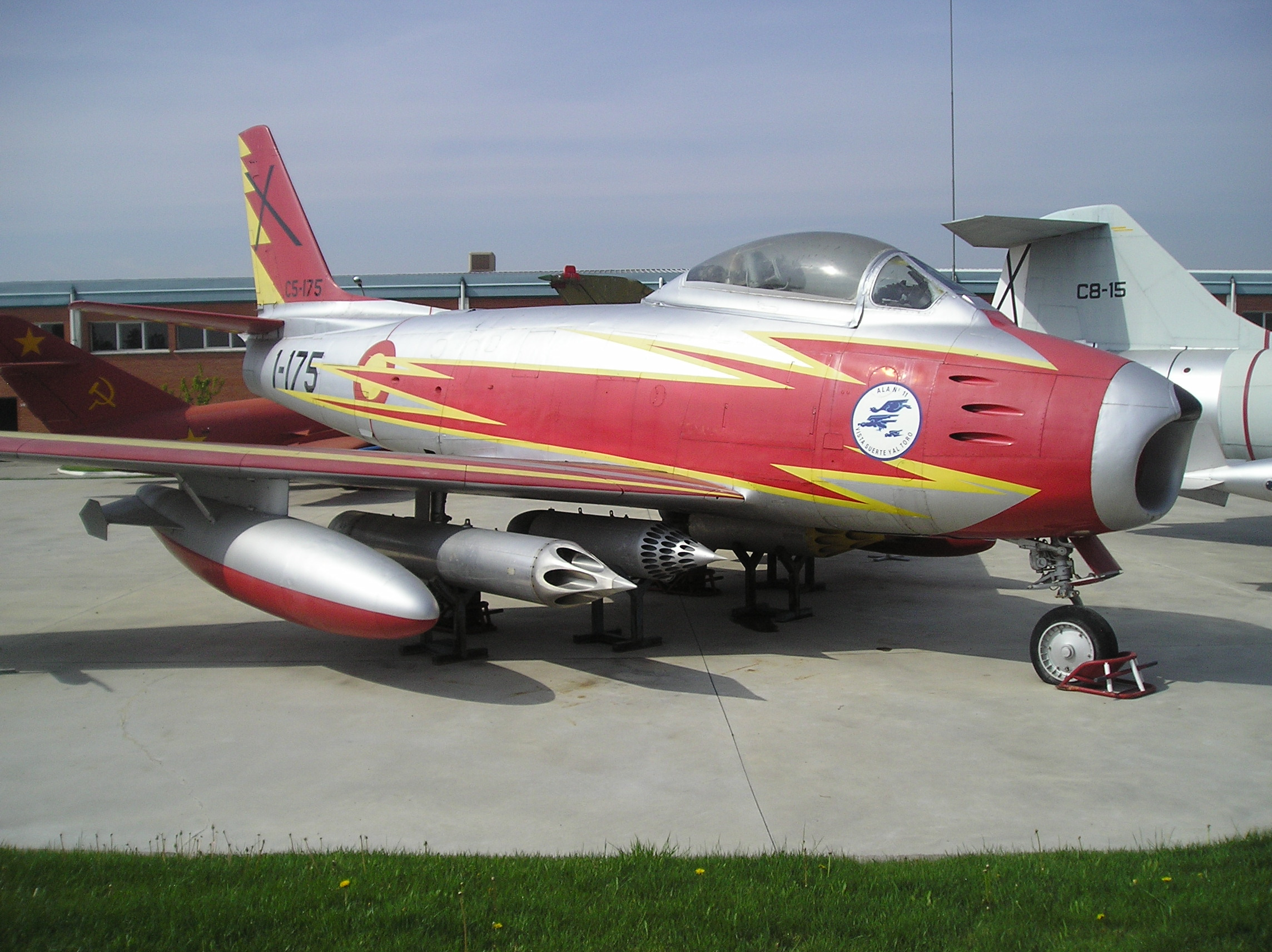
F-86 Spanish Air Army, Ember Patrol, Cuatro Vientos, Madrid

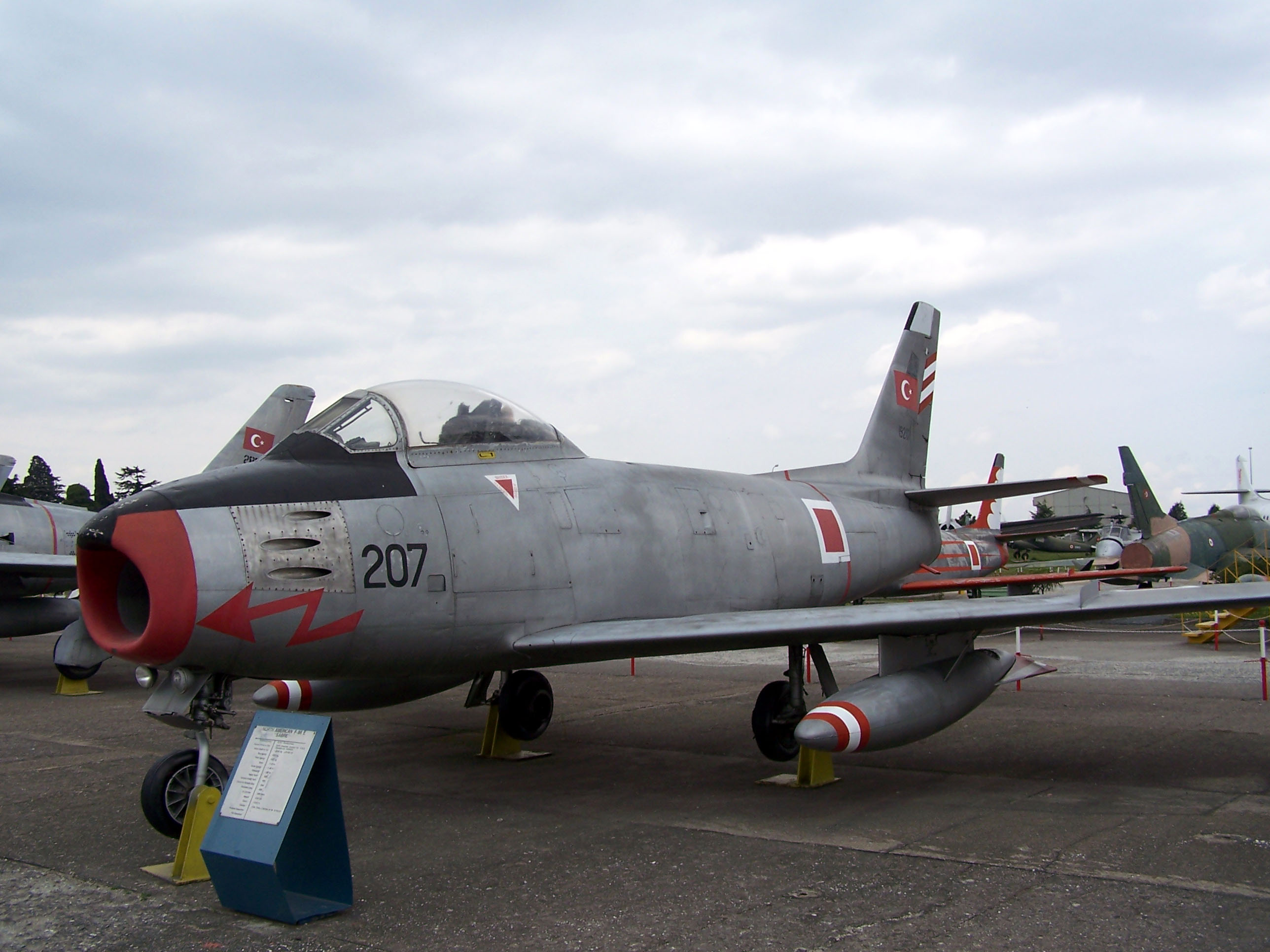
North American F-86E Sabre in Istanbul Aviation Museum

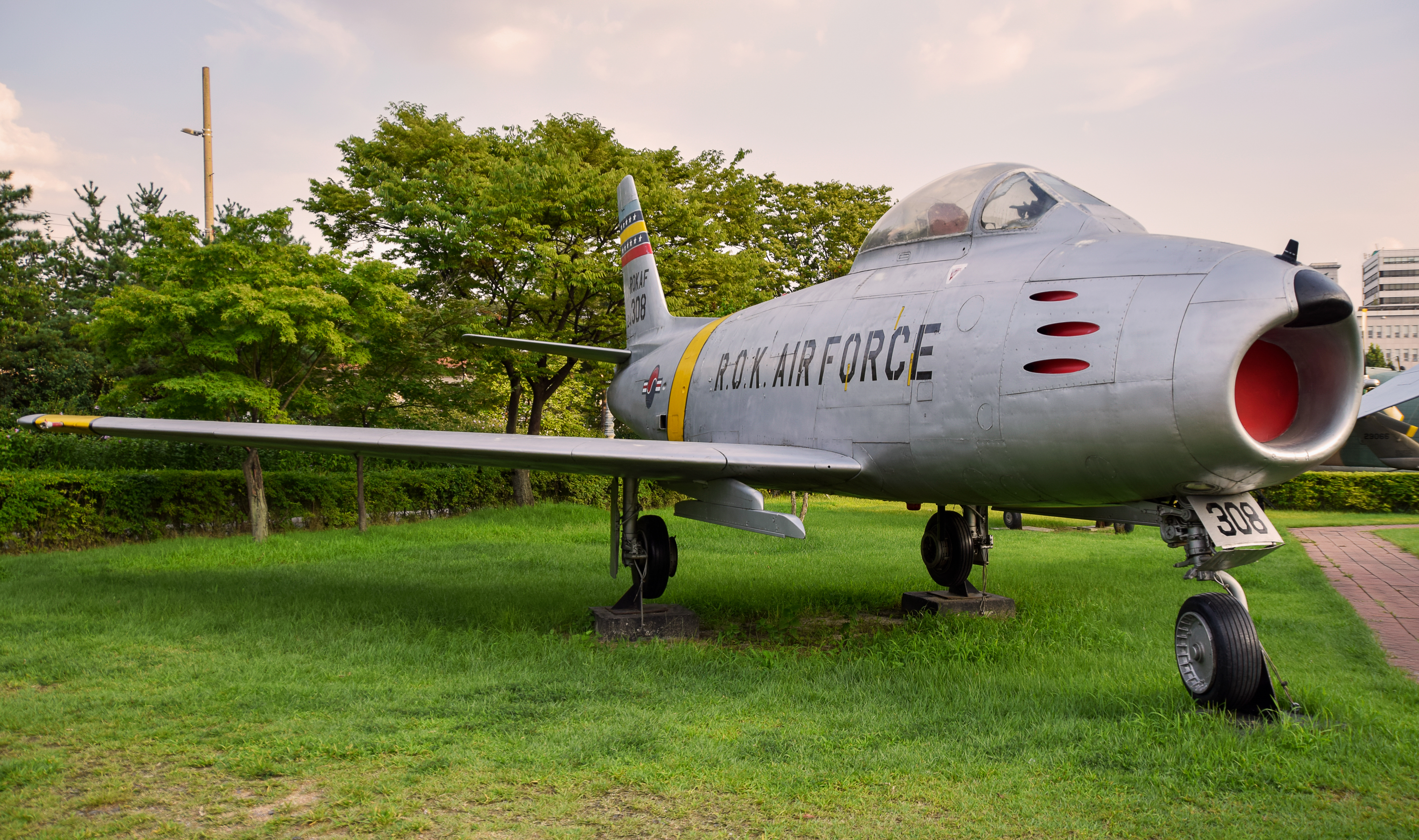
North American F-86F Sabre of the ROKAF

Argentina

- Argentine Air Force

Acquired 28 F-86Fs in 1960. The Sabres were in reserve at the time of the Falklands War but were reinstated to active duty against possible Chilean involvement. Retired in 1986.
Australia

- Royal Australian Air Force

Bangladesh

- Bangladesh Air Force

Captured 8 F-86F-40-NAs from Pakistan.
Belgium

- Belgian Air Force

5 F-86F Sabres delivered, no operational unit.
Bolivia

- Bolivian Air Force

Canada

- Royal Canadian Air Force (RCAF)

Colombia

- Colombian Air Force

Acquired four F-86Fs from Spanish Air Force (s/n 2027/2028), five USAF F-86F (s/n 51-13226) and other nine Canadair Mk.6; assigned to Escuadron de Caza-Bombardero.
Denmark

- Royal Danish Air Force

59 F-86D-31NA(38) F-86D-36NA(21)s in service from 1958 to 1966 ESK 723, ESK 726, ESK 728
Ethiopia

- Ethiopian Air Force

Acquired 14 F-86Fs in 1960.
West Germany

- German Air Force (Luftwaffe) – see North American F-86D Sabre and Canadair Sabre

Honduras

- Honduran Air Force

Acquired 10 CL.13 Mk2 (F-86E) from Yugoslavia.

Iran

- Imperial Iranian Air Force

Acquired an unknown number of F-86Fs.
Iraq

- Iraqi Air Force

Bought some examples but they were never operated and were returned.
Japan

- Japanese Air Self-Defense Force (JASDF)

Acquired 180 U.S. F-86Fs, 1955–1957. Mitsubishi built 300 F-86Fs under license 1956–1961, and were assigned to 10 fighter hikōtai or squadrons. JASDF called F-86F the "Kyokukō" (旭光, Rising Sunbeam) and F-86D the "Gekkō" (月光, Moon Light). Their Blue Impulse Aerobatic Team, a total of 18 F-models were converted to reconnaissance version in 1962. Some aircraft were returned to the Naval Air Weapons Station China Lake, California, as drones.

Norway

- Royal Norwegian Air Force

Acquired 115 F-86Fs, 1957–1958; and assigned to seven squadrons, Nos. 331, 332, 334, 336, 337, 338 and 339.
Pakistan

- Pakistani Air Force

Acquired 120 U.S.-built F-86F-35-NA and F-86F-40-NAs, last of North American Aviation's production line, 1954–1960s. Used from 1955 to 1980.
Peru

- Peruvian Air Force

Acquired 26 U.S.-built F-86Fs in 1955, assigned to Escuadrón Aéreo 111, Grupo Aéreo No.11 at Talara air force base. Finally retired in 1979.
Philippines

- Philippine Air Force

Acquired 50 F-86Fs in 1957. Retired in the late 1970s.
Portugal

- Portuguese Air Force

Acquired 65 Sabres including 50 U.S.-built F-86Fs, in 1958 and 15 ex-Royal Norwegian Air Force airframes. In Portugal, they served in Squadron 201 (formerly Sqn. 50 and later Sqn. 51, before being renamed in 1978) and Squadron 52, both based at Air Base No. 5, Monte Real. In 1961, the Portuguese Air Force deployed some of its F-86Fs to Portuguese Guinea, where they formed Detachment 52, based at Base-Aerodrome No. 2, Bissalanca/Bissau.
Taiwan (Republic of China)

- Republic of China Air Force

Acquired 320 U.S.-built F-86Fs,7 RF-86Fs,18 F-86Ds, The 18 F-86Ds back to U.S. military and US send 6 to Republic of Korea Air Force,8 to Philippine Air Force in 1966.
Saudi Arabia

- Royal Saudi Air Force

Acquired 16 U.S.-built F-86Fs in 1958, and three F-86Fs from Norway in 1966; and assigned to No. 7 Squadron RSAF at Dhahran.
South Africa

- South African Air Force

Loaned 22 U.S.-built F-86F-30s during the Korean War and saw action with 2 Squadron SAAF.
South Korea

- Republic of Korea Air Force

Acquired 112 U.S.-built F-86Fs and 10 RF-86Fs, beginning 20 June 1955; and assigned to ROKAF 10th Wing. It also served with the ROKAF Black Eagles aerobatic team for annual event from 1959 to 1966. The last F-86s retired in 1990.
Spain

- Spanish Air Force

Acquired 270 U.S.-built F-86Fs, 1955–1958; designated C.5s and assigned to 5 wings: Ala de Caza 1, 2, 4, 5, and 6. Retired 1972.
Thailand

- Royal Thai Air Force

Acquired 40 U.S.-built F-86Fs, 1962; assigned to RTAF Squadrons, Nos. 12 (Ls), 13, and 43.

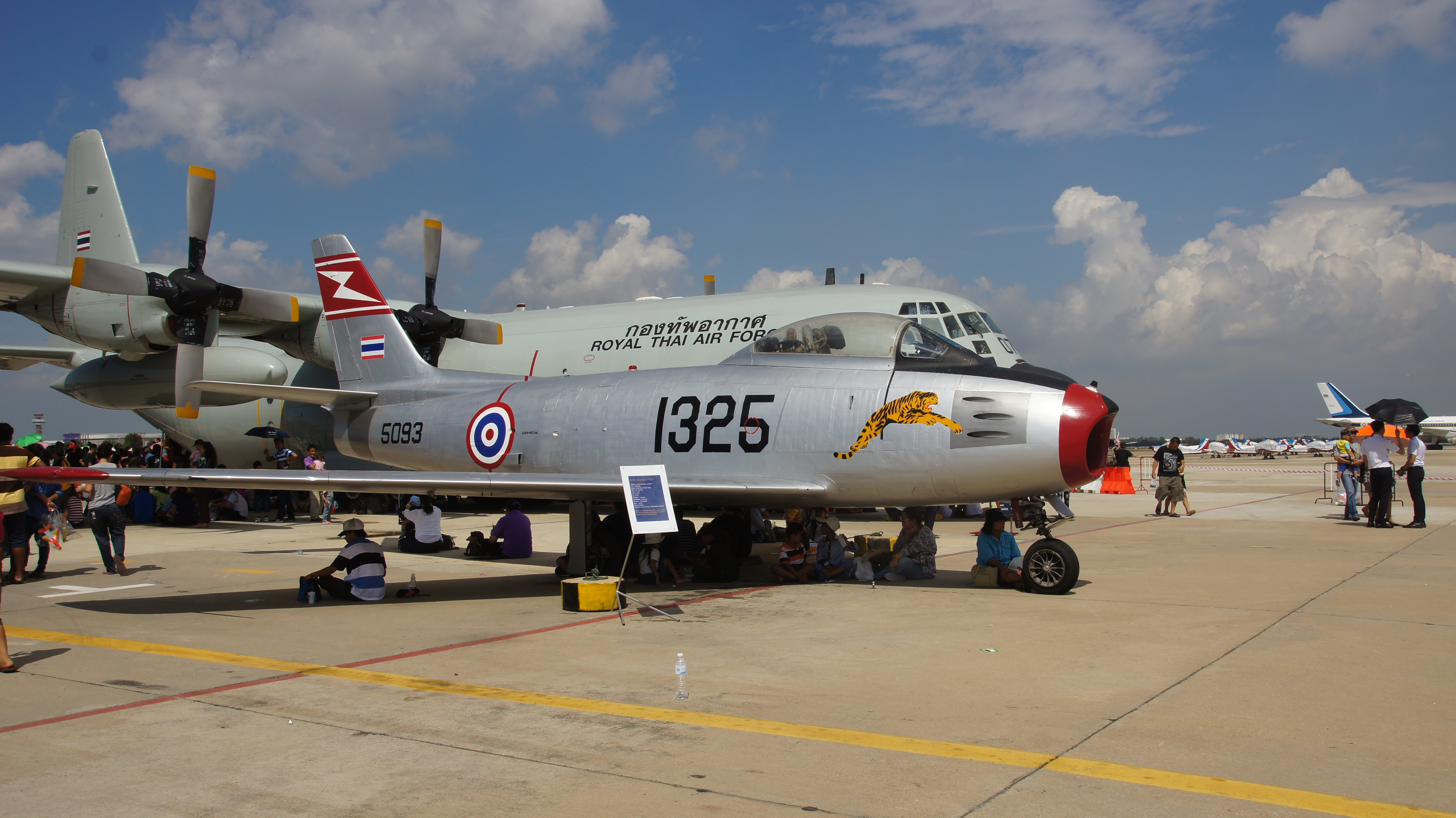
A retired Royal Thai Air Force F-86

Tunisia

- Tunisian Air Force

Acquired 15 used U.S.-built F-86F in 1969.
Turkey

- Turkish Air Force

Acquired 107 ex-RCAF Canadair CL-13 Sabre Mk.2 “F-86E(M)„ in 1954, retired 1968.
United Nations

- United Nations Operation in the Congo

Received 5 F-86E(M)s from Italy as MAP redeployment 1963, flown by Philippine pilots; F-86F units from Ethiopia and Iran also used in ONUC.
United States

- United States Air Force

Venezuela

- Venezuelan Air Force

Acquired 30 U.S.-built F-86Fs, October 1955 – December 1960; and assigned to one group, Grupo Aéreo De Caza No. 12, three other squadrons.
Yugoslavia

- Yugoslav Air Force

Acquired 121 Canadair CL-13s and F-86Es, operating them in several fighter aviation regiments between 1956 and 1971.

=== Civil aviation ===
According to the FAA there are 50 privately owned and registered F-86s in the US, including Canadair CL-13 Sabres. (Note: Although privately registered in the US, two F-86s are actually owned by an individual for display purposes only in a private museum collection.)

=== Notable pilots ===
- Sqn Ldr (later Air commodore) M. M. Alam, Pakistan Air Force, became a flying ace by shooting down five Indian Air Force fighters within one minute in the Indo-Pakistani War of 1965. He was awarded the Sitara-e-Jurat ("The star of courage") and bar.
- Colonel Edwin "Buzz" Aldrin, USAF test pilot and NASA astronaut of Apollo 11 fame. Credited with having shot down two MiGs over Korea.
- Major Rudolf Anderson, Jr. USAF (4028th Strategic Reconnaissance Squadron). Shot down and killed in 1962 while flying a U-2 spy plane over Cuba during the Cuban Missile Crisis.
- Colonel Royal N. Baker (13 victories), commander USAF 4 FIW.
- Wing Commander John Robert Baldwin DSO & Bar, DFC & Bar, AFC was a Royal Air Force fighter pilot and the top scoring fighter ace flying the Hawker Typhoon exclusively during the Second World War. He was posted missing, presumed killed, during service with the United States Air Force in the Korean War flying a Sabre.
- Lieutenant Colonel Antonio Bautista of the Philippine Air Force received the Distinguished Conduct Star for his valor and bravery in providing close air support to ground forces.
- Major General Frederick C. Blesse (10 victories)
- Major (later Lt Col) John F. Bolt, US Marine Corps, 6 victories while on exchange duty with the 39th FS, 51st FG, previously 6 victories in World War II and the only Marine to become an ace in two wars.
- 1st Lieutenant [Later Colonel] John Boyd, USAF, flying 22 missions in the F-86E and F models, with the 25th FIS (51st FIW) June–July 1953.
- 1st Lieutenant John M. Conroy, completed "Operation Boomerang" on 21 May 1955, a record-setting coast-to-coast and back in one day during daylight hours of 5058 miles in 11 hours, 26 mins, 33 secs.
- Major George Davis (14 victories), USAF 4 FIW, awarded the Medal of Honor posthumously
- Lieutenant Commander Theodore H Faller, 13 August 1979 – U.S. Navy Lieutenant Commander Theodore "Ted" Faller was killed when his QF-86 Sabre suffered an engine failure moments after takeoff. Faller managed to bring the stricken aircraft down in a vacant lot 600 yards south of the Ridgecrest Heights Elementary School, later renamed Theodore Faller Elementary School.
- Captain Manuel "Pete" Fernandez, (14.5 victories), USAF 4 FIW
- Colonel Francis S. "Gabby" Gabreski (six and one-half victories), USAF 51 FIW commander, top European U.S. ace in World War II
- Colonel Vermont Garrison (five victories), USAF 4 FIW, ace in World War II and combat veteran of three wars
- Colonel Ralph "Hoot" Gibson (five victories), USAF 4 FIW
- Major John Glenn, a U.S. Marine Corps exchange pilot with the USAF 51 FIW (3 victories). First American astronaut to orbit the Earth, later a U.S. Senator from Ohio.
- Lieutenant Colonel Virgil "Gus" Grissom, astronaut in the Mercury, Gemini and Apollo programs, died in a fire during testing for the Apollo 1 mission.
- Major (later Colonel) James P. Hagerstrom, (8 1/2 victories) World War II ace.
- 1st Lieutenant Robert A. "Bob" Hoover, USAF 52 FIW, North American Aviation experimental engineering test pilot.
- Captain James Horowitz (1 victory), USAF 4 FIW, novelist and author of The Hunters under the pen name James Salter
- Colonel James Jabara (15 victories), USAF 4 FIW
- Colonel James H. Kasler (six victories), USAF 4 FIW and only three-time recipient of the Air Force Cross
- Captain Iven Kincheloe (five victories) USAF 51 FIW, test pilot selected to fly the North American X-15
- Second Lieutenant Gene Kranz, NASA flight director for Gemini and Apollo and assistant flight director on Project Mercury- flew with 69th FBS in South Korea
- 1st Lt (later Major) James F. Low, only Korean War USAF pilot to reach ace status while still a 2nd Lt; inspiration for the character of 2nd Lt Ed Pell in the novel and movie The Hunters by James Horowitz (a.k.a. James Salter); later a Vietnam War POW
- Squadron Leader Andy Mackenzie, DFC. RCAF Second World War fighter ace (8.5 victories); taken POW when his F-86 was shot down while flying with the USAF 51 FIW in Korea in 1952.
- Colonel Walker "Bud" Mahurin, USAF 4 FIG commander and World War II ace
- Major General Howard Thomas Markey, first chief judge of the United States Court of Appeals for the Federal Circuit
- Captain Joseph C. McConnell (16 victories), USAF 51 FIW, who later died in a crash at Edwards Air Force Base testing the F-86H
- Colonel (later General) John C. Meyer (two victories), USAF 4 FIW commander, World War II ace, and later Vice Chief of Staff of the USAF.
- Squadron Leader Sarfaraz Ahmed Rafiqui (two victories), Officer Commanding of PAF's No. 5 Squadron, awarded the Hilal-i-Jur'at and later KIA during the Indo-Pakistani War of 1965.
- Brigadier General James Robinson Risner (eight victories), USAF awarded the Air Force Cross, later Vietnam War POW
- Colonel Harrison R. Thyng (five victories), USAF 4 FIW commander
- Major (later Colonel) William T. Whisner Jr. (5 1/2 victories), World War II ace

== Specifications (F-86F-40-NA) ==
3-view drawing of the F-86F Sabre.

Data from The North American Sabre and North American F-86F-40-NA

General characteristics

- Crew: 1
- Length: 37 ft 1 in (11.30 m)
- Wingspan: 39 ft 1 in (11.91 m)
- Height: 14 ft 1 in (4.29 m)
- Wing area: 313.4 sq ft (29.12 m^{2})
- Airfoil: root: NACA 0009-64 mod.; tip: NACA 0008.1-64 mod.
- Empty weight: 11,125 lb (5,046 kg)
- Gross weight: 15,198 lb (6,894 kg)
- Max takeoff weight: 18,152 lb (8,234 kg)
- Fuel capacity: JP-4 fuel: 437 US gallons (364 imp gal; 1,650 L) internals + 2 x 200 US gallons (170 imp gal; 760 L) drop tanks
- Powerplant: 1 × General Electric J47-GE-27 turbojet engine, 5,910 lbf (26.3 kN) thrust

Performance

- Maximum speed: 687 mph (1,106 km/h, 597 kn) at sea level at 14,212 lb (6,446 kg) combat weight

599 mph (521 kn; 964 km/h) at 35,000 ft (10,668 m) at 15,352 lb (6,964 kg)

- Stall speed: 124 mph (200 km/h, 108 kn)
- Range: 1,525 mi (2,454 km, 1,325 nmi)
- Combat range: 414 mi (666 km, 360 nmi) with two 1,000 lb (454 kg) bombs and 2x 200 US gallons (170 imp gal; 760 L) drop tanks
- Service ceiling: 49,600 ft (15,100 m) at combat weight
- Rate of climb: 9,000 ft/min (46 m/s) at sea level
- Time to altitude: 30,000 ft (9,144 m) in 5 minutes 12 seconds
- Lift-to-drag: 15
- Thrust/weight: 0.39 (combat weight) – 0.29 (maximum takeoff weight)

Armament

- Guns: 6 x 0.50 in (12.7 mm) M3 Browning machine guns (1,800 rounds in total)
- Rockets: variety of rocket launchers; e.g.: 2 Matra rocket pods with 18 SNEB 68 mm rockets per pod
- Bombs: 5,300 lb (2,400 kg) of payload on four external hardpoints, bombs were usually mounted on outer two pylons as the inner pairs were plumbed for two 200 US gallons (760 L) drop tanks which gave the Sabre a more useful range. A wide variety of bombs could be carried (max standard loadout being two 1,000 pounds (450 kg) bombs plus two drop tanks), napalm canisters and could have included a tactical nuclear weapon.

Avionics

- AN/APG-5 – Airborne Range-Only (ARO) radar
- AN/APG-30 – Fire-control radar
- AN/APG-37 – Search radar
- AN/ARC-34 – UHF radio system

== See also ==
- Aircraft in fiction#F-86 Sabre for notable appearances in the media.
- Semi-Automatic Ground Environment
- Tactical Air Command

Related development

- CAC Sabre
- Canadair Sabre
- North American F-86D Sabre
- North American F-100 Super Sabre
- North American FJ-1 Fury
- North American FJ-2/-3 Fury
- North American FJ-4 Fury
- North American YF-93

Aircraft of comparable role, configuration, and era

- Dassault Mystère
- FMA IAe 33 Pulqui II
- Grumman F-9 Cougar
- Hawker Hunter
- Lavochkin La-15
- Mikoyan-Gurevich MiG-15
- Mikoyan-Gurevich MiG-17
- Republic F-84F Thunderstreak
- Saab 29 Tunnan

Related lists

- List of fighter aircraft
- List of military aircraft of the United States
- Lists of air show accidents and incidents
