= K-42 =

K-42 or K42 may refer to:

- K42, a discontinued open-source research operating system
- K-42 (Kansas highway)
- K-42 Camera, a prototype airborne photo reconnaissance camera
- INS Nipat (K42), a corvette of the Indian Navy
- Potassium-42, an isotope of potassium
