= XGAM-71 Buck Duck =

American decoy missile prototype

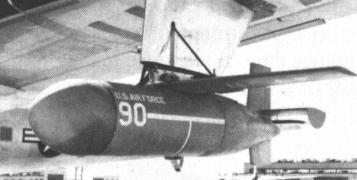
- A XGAM-71 on the underwing of its mothership.

General information
- Type: Decoy missile
- Manufacturer: Convair
- Status: Cancelled January 1956
- Primary user: United States Air Force

History
- First flight: 14 February 1955

The Convair XGAM-71 Buck Duck was an air-launched decoy missile that was developed by Convair in the early 1950s. It was intended to have the same radar signature as the Strategic Air Command's B-36 bomber, thereby allowing it to disrupt the enemy's air defenses and dilute their effort to shoot down an incoming bomber fleet.

Convair built the first prototype using its own funds, but the company received an official development contract from the United States Air Force on 16 August 1954. The USAF's Materiel Command project designation for the program was MX-2224. When the Air Force decided to put the project into production, it received the designation GAM-71.

As initially envisioned by the Air Force, one B-36 in the then-typical three-plane attack formation would be filled with up to seven GAM-71s apportioned within its three bomb bays. A mixture of Ducks and other weapons was also possible, although the Air Force did not specify that it intended to use mixed loads.

To fit in the bomb bay of a B-36, the GAM-71 was relatively small; its wings were folded when it was stowed in the bay. To mimic the radar cross-section of the B-36, it carried internal radar reflectors.

In February 1955, unpowered glide tests of XGAM-71 prototypes began using a modified B-29 Superfortress as the mothership. However, the program was delayed due to funding issues. Convair also had higher priorities. A total of seven flights were conducted before the program was cancelled in January 1956, an event that researcher Dennis Jenkins attributes to the B-36's anticipated phase-out by decade's end.

== Specifications ==
Data from Magnesium Overcast; The Evolution of the Cruise Missile Parsch 2007

General characteristics

- Crew: None
- Length: 13 ft (4.0 m)
- Wingspan: 14 ft (4.3 m)
- Height: 4 ft 3 in (1.3 m)
- Gross weight: 1,550 lb (703 kg)
- Powerplant: 1 × Aerojet XLR-85-AJ-1 liquid fuel rocket, 90 lbf (0.40 kN) thrust

Performance

- Maximum speed: Mach 0.55
- Range: 230 mi (370 km, 200 nmi)
- Service ceiling: 40,000 ft (12,000 m)

== See also ==
- Convair B-36 Peacemaker

Aircraft of comparable role, configuration, and era

- ADM-20 Quail
- List of military aircraft of the United States
- List of missiles
