= Convair B-36 Peacemaker =

US Air Force strategic bomber (1949–1959)

B-36 "Peacemaker"
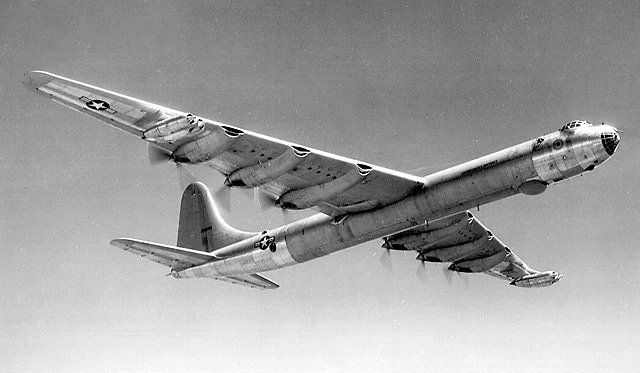
- Beginning with the B-36D (B-36J shown), the Peacemaker used six radial piston engines and four jet engines

General information
- Type: Strategic bomber
- National origin: United States
- Manufacturer: Convair
- Designer: Isaac M. Laddon
- Status: Retired
- Primary user: United States Air Force
- Number built: 384

History
- Manufactured: 1946–1954
- Introduction date: 1948
- First flight: 8 August 1946
- Retired: 12 February 1959
- Variants: Convair XC-99; Convair NB-36H
- Developed into: Convair YB-60; Convair X-6

The Convair B-36 "Peacemaker" (Note: Convair proposed the name "Peacemaker" in a submission to a contest to name the bomber. Although the name "Peacemaker" was not officially adopted, it was commonly used and sources often state or imply the name is "official".) was a piston-engined, strategic bomber built by Convair and operated by the United States Air Force's Strategic Air Command from 1948 to 1959. With 384 units built, the B-36 remains the largest mass-produced, piston-engined aircraft and has the longest wingspan of any combat aircraft. The B-36 was capable of intercontinental flight without refueling.

The B-36 was powered by six Pratt & Whitney R-4360 Wasp Major radial piston engines. The B-36D through J variants were further fitted with four General Electric J47 turbojet engines, totaling 10, the most engines of any mass-produced aircraft. The B-36 was the primary nuclear weapons delivery vehicle of the United States. It was the only bomber assigned the largest of the cumbersome first generation of US thermonuclear gravity bombs, the Mark 14 (5 to 7 megatons), Mark 17, and Mark 24 (15 to 20 megatons). It was also assigned the fission-based Mark 6 and Mark 18 and the conventional T-12 Cloudmaker earthquake bomb.

The B-36 was never flown in combat. The bomber was conceived for transatlantic raids against German-occupied Europe in the contingency that United States Army Air Forces lost access to British airbases, but the war ended before its first flight in 1946. B-36s were used to signal nuclear deterrence in the early Cold War, flying to Britain and French Morocco. The RB-36 variants were used for aerial reconnaissance and were the highest- and furthest-flying US aircraft until the Lockheed U-2. RB-36s imaged the Soviet Arctic operating from RAF Sculthorpe in England, and during the Korean War, the Soviet Far East and Manchuria in China flying from Yokota Air Base, Japan.

The NB-36H tested the world's first operation of an onboard nuclear reactor under the Aircraft Nuclear Propulsion program, ahead of the unrealized X-6. B-36s trialed RF-84F Thunderstreak and XF-85 Goblin parasite fighters, XGAM-71 Buck Duck decoy missiles, and JB-2 cruise missiles. The airframe was enlarged into the prototype XC-99 cargo plane. Convair unsuccessfully proposed a fully jet-powered successor, the Convair YB-60, but the bomber was replaced by Boeing's jet-powered B-52 Stratofortress beginning in 1955. All but four B-36s have been scrapped.

== Development ==
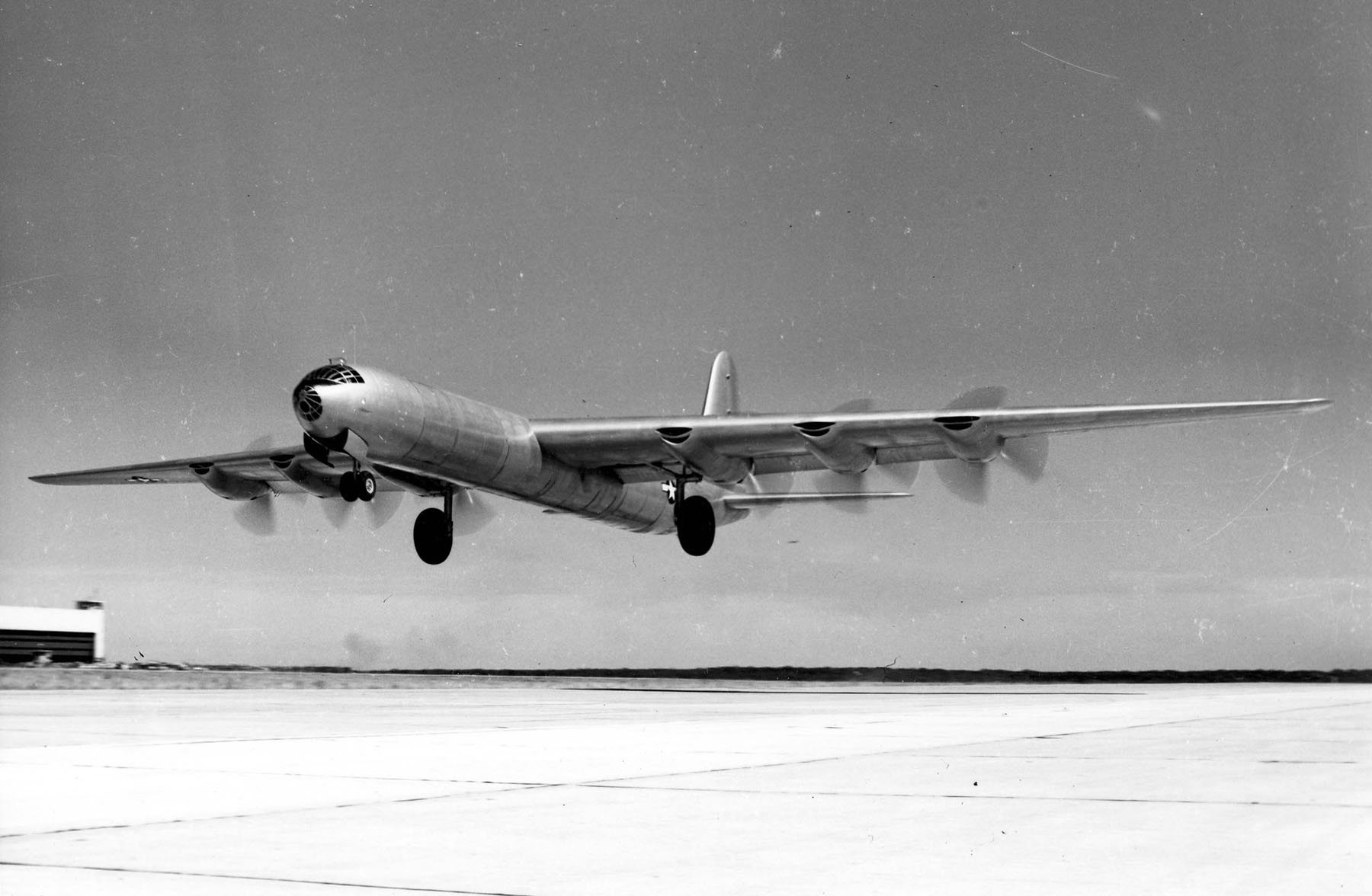
The prototype XB-36

The design of the B-36 can be traced to early 1941, before the entry of the United States into World War II. At the time, Britain had won the Battle of Britain but was still subject to the Nazi "Blitz" attacks.

The United States would need a new bomber to reach Europe and return to bases in North America, necessitating a combat range of at least 5,700 mi (9,200 km), the length of a Gander, Newfoundland–Berlin round trip. The USAAC therefore sought a bomber of truly intercontinental range. The German Reichsluftfahrtministerium would request the similar ultralong-range Amerikabomber program on 12 May 1942.

The USAAC sent out an initial request on 11 April 1941, asking for a 450 mph (720 km/h) top speed, a 275 mph (443 km/h) cruising speed, a service ceiling of 45,000 ft (14,000 m), and a maximum range of 12,000 mi (19,000 km) at 25,000 ft (7,600 m). These requirements were too demanding and far exceeded the technology of the day, so on 19 August 1941, they were reduced to a maximum range of 10,000 mi (16,000 km), an effective combat radius of 4,000 mi (6,400 km) with a 10,000 lb (4,500 kg) bomb load, a cruising speed between 240 and 300 mph (390 and 480 km/h), and a service ceiling of 40,000 ft (12,000 m) The ceiling in both cases was chosen to exceed the maximum effective altitude of most of Nazi Germany's antiaircraft guns.

=== World War II and after ===
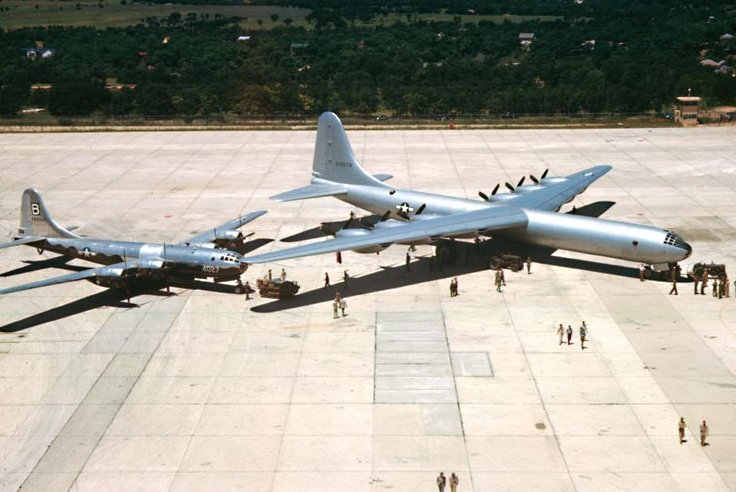
The XB-36 (right) alongside a Boeing B-29 Superfortress

In the Pacific, the USAAF needed a bomber capable of reaching Japan from bases in Hawaii, so the development of the B-36 became a priority. Secretary of War Henry L. Stimson, in discussions with high-ranking officers of the USAAF, decided to waive normal army procurement procedures. On 23 July 1943, 15 months after the Germans' Amerikabomber proposals, and the same day that the German firm Heinkel began design on a six-engined bomber of its own, the USAAF submitted a "letter of intent" to Convair for an initial production run of 100, even before testing of the two prototypes was complete. The first delivery was due in August 1945, and the last in October 1946, but Consolidated (by now renamed Convair after merging with Vultee Aircraft) delayed delivery. Three months after V-E Day, the aircraft was unveiled on 20 August 1945, and flew for the first time on 8 August 1946, five years after its design.

After the start of the Cold War with the 1948 Berlin Airlift, and the 1949 atmospheric test of the first Soviet atomic bomb, American military planners sought bombers capable of delivering the very large and heavy, first-generation atomic bombs.

The B-36 was the only American aircraft with the range and payload to carry such bombs from airfields on American soil to targets in the USSR. The modification to allow the use of larger atomic weapons on the B-36 was called the "Grand Slam Installation".

The B-36 from the outset faced the widespread introduction of opposing jet fighters, and was relegated to an "interim" role pending delivery of jet alternatives. The Boeing B-47 Stratojet, its jet-engined counterpart, did not become fully operational until 1953, and lacked the range to attack the Soviet Union from North America without aerial refueling and could not carry the huge Mark 16 hydrogen bomb.

The other American piston bombers of the day, the Boeing B-29 Superfortress and Boeing B-50 Superfortress, were also too limited in range. Intercontinental ballistic missiles did not become sufficiently reliable until the early 1960s. Until the Boeing B-52 Stratofortress became operational in 1955, the B-36 was the primary nuclear weapons-delivery vehicle of the Strategic Air Command (SAC).

Convair touted the B-36 as the "aluminum overcast", a so-called "long rifle", giving SAC truly global reach. During General Curtis LeMay's tenure as head of SAC (1949–57), the B-36 formed the heart of SAC. Its maximum payload was more than four times that of the B-29 and exceeded that of the later B-52.

The B-36 was slow and could not refuel in midair, but could fly missions to targets 3,400 mi (5,500 km) away and stay aloft as long as 40 hours. Moreover, the B-36 was believed to have "an ace up its sleeve", a phenomenal cruising altitude for a piston-driven aircraft, made possible by its huge wing area and six engines, putting it out of range of most interceptors, as well as ground-based anti-aircraft guns.

=== Experimentals and prototypes ===
"USAF Atomic Bomb Delivery Aircraft" (1952)

Consolidated Vultee Aircraft Corporation (later Convair) and Boeing Aircraft Company took part in the competition, with Consolidated winning a tender on 16 October 1941. Consolidated asked for a $15 million contract with $800,000 for research and development, mockup, and tooling. Two experimental bombers were proposed, the first to be delivered in 30 months, and the second within 36 months. Originally designated Model B-35, the name was changed to B-36 to avoid confusion with the Northrop YB-35 piston-engined, flying-wing bomber, against which the B-36 was meant to compete for a production contract.

Throughout its development, the B-36 program encountered delays. When the United States entered World War II, Consolidated was ordered to slow B-36 development to greatly increase Consolidated B-24 Liberator production. The first mockup was inspected on 20 July 1942, after six months of refinements. A month after the inspection, the project was moved from San Diego, California, to Fort Worth, Texas, which set back development several months. Consolidated changed the tail from a twin to a single, thereby saving 3,850 lb (1,750 kg), but this change delayed delivery by a further 120 days.

Changes in the USAAF requirements added back the weight saved in redesigns, and cost more time. A new antenna system needed to be designed to accommodate a new radio and radar system, and the Pratt and Whitney engines were redesigned, adding another 1,000 lb (450 kg).

== Design ==
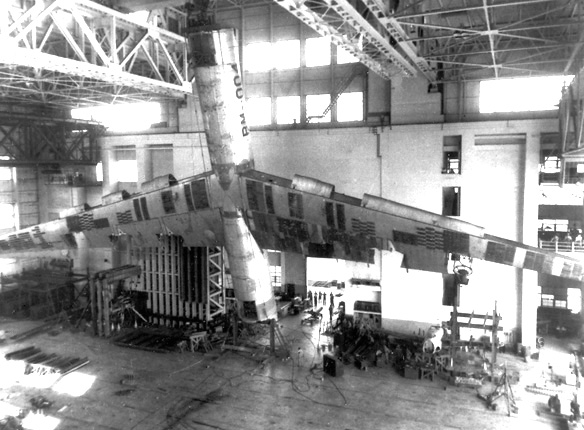
A B-36 airframe undergoing structural stability tests: The three men in the balcony at the right of the photograph provide scale.

The B-36 was two-thirds longer than the previous "superbomber", the B-29, and its wingspan and height exceeded those of the Soviet Union's 1960s Antonov An-22, the largest turboprop aircraft ever produced. Only with the advent of the Boeing 747 and the Lockheed C-5 Galaxy, both designed two decades later, did aircraft capable of lifting a heavier payload enter service.

The wings of the B-36 were large even when compared with present-day aircraft, exceeding, for example, those of the C-5 Galaxy, and enabled the B-36 to carry enough fuel to fly the intended long missions without refueling. The maximum thickness of the wing, measured perpendicular to the chord, was 7.5 ft (2.3 m), containing a crawlspace that allowed access to the engines. The wing area permitted cruising altitudes well above the operating ceiling of any 1940s-era fighters, over 40,000 ft (12,000 m). In 1954, the turrets and other nonessential equipment were stripped out (not unlike the earlier Silverplate program for the atomic bomb-carrying "specialist" B-29s), resulting in a "featherweight" configuration that increased top speed to 423 mph (681 km/h), and cruise at 50,000 ft (15,000 m) and dash at over 55,000 ft (17,000 m), perhaps even higher.

The large wing area, with the four jet engines supplementing the piston engines in later versions, gave the B-36 a wide margin between stall speed (V_{S}) and maximum speed (V_{max}) at these altitudes. This made the B-36 more maneuverable at high altitude than most jet interceptors of the day, which could not maneuver effectively above 40,000 ft (12,000 m). However, the U.S. Navy McDonnell F2H Banshee fighter could intercept the B-36, due to its ability to operate at more than 50,000 ft (15,000 m). Later, the new secretary of Defense, Louis A. Johnson, who considered the U.S. Navy and naval aviation essentially obsolete in favor of the USAF and SAC, forbade putting the Navy's claim to the test.

The propulsion system of the B-36 was unique, with six 28-cylinder Pratt & Whitney R-4360 Wasp Major radial engines mounted in an unusual pusher configuration, rather than the conventional tractor propeller layout of other heavy bombers. The prototype's six R-4360s delivered 18,000 hp (13,000 kW), which resulted in early B-36s needing long takeoff runs, which was ameliorated when power was boosted to 22,800 hp (17,000 kW). Each engine drove a three-bladed propeller, 19 ft (5.8 m) in diameter, mounted in a pusher configuration. This unusual configuration prevented propeller turbulence from interfering with airflow over the wing, but led to engine overheating due to insufficient airflow around the engines, resulting in inflight engine fires. The large, slow-turning propellers interacted with the high-pressure airflow behind the wings to produce an easily recognizable very-low-frequency pulse at ground level that betrayed approaching flights.

=== Addition of jet propulsion ===
Beginning with the B-36D, Convair added a pair of General Electric J47-19 jet engines suspended near the end of each wing, which were also retrofitted to surviving B-36Bs. Consequently, the B-36 was configured to have 10 engines, six radial propeller engines and four jet engines, leading to the B-36 slogan of "six turnin' and four burnin'". The B-36 had more engines than any other mass-produced aircraft. The jet pods greatly improved takeoff performance and dash speed over the target. In normal cruising flight, the jet engines were shut down to conserve fuel. When the jet engines were shut down, louvers closed off the front of the pods to reduce drag. The two pods with four turbojets and the six piston engines combined gave the B-36 a total of 40,000 hp (30,000 kW) for short periods of time.

=== Crew ===
The B-36 had a crew of 15. As with the B-29 and B-50, the pressurized flight deck and crew compartment were linked to the rear compartment by a pressurized tunnel through the bomb bay. In the B-36, movement through the tunnel was on a wheeled trolley, pulling on a rope. The rear compartment featured six bunks and a dining galley and led to the tail turret.

=== Landing gear ===
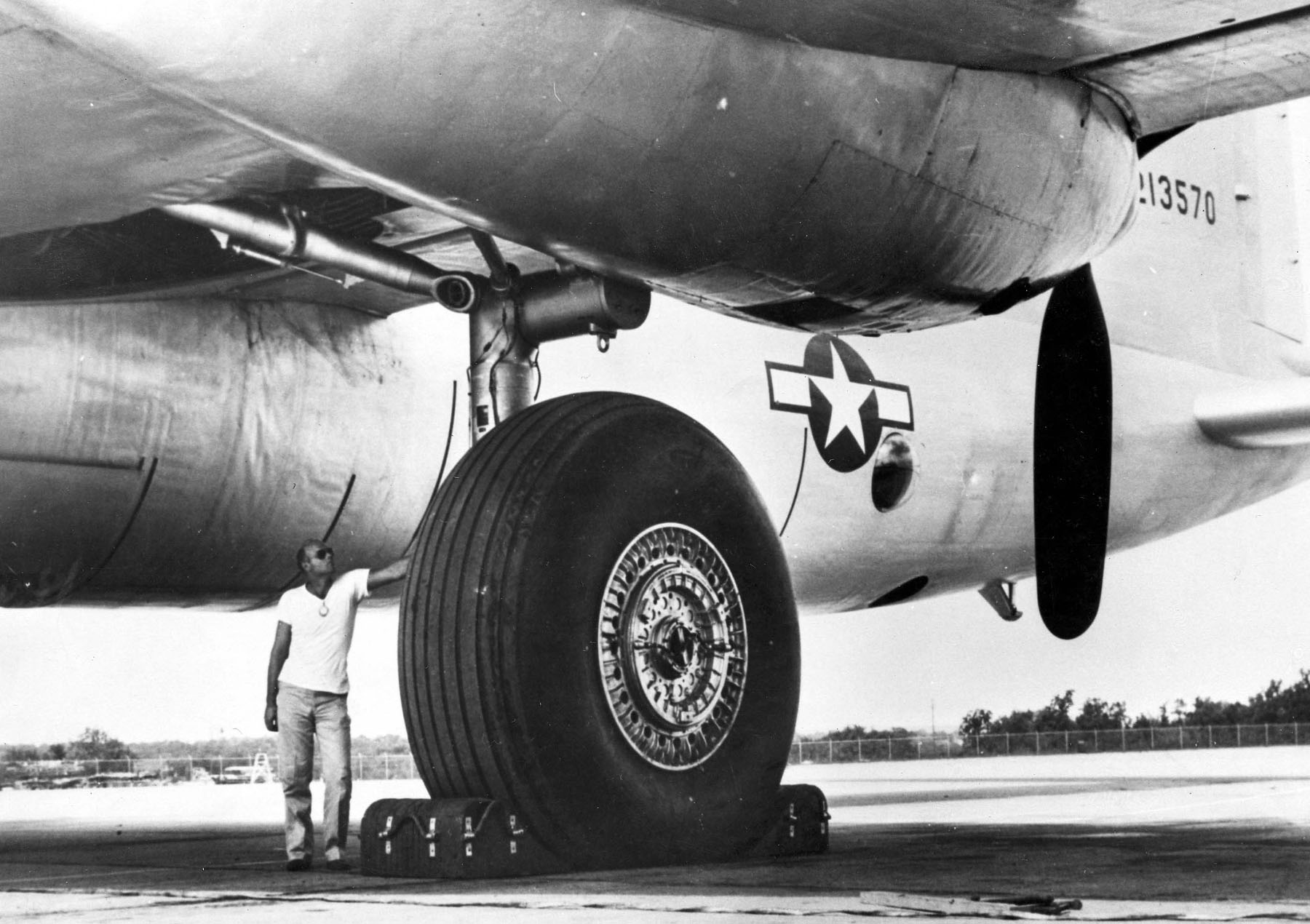
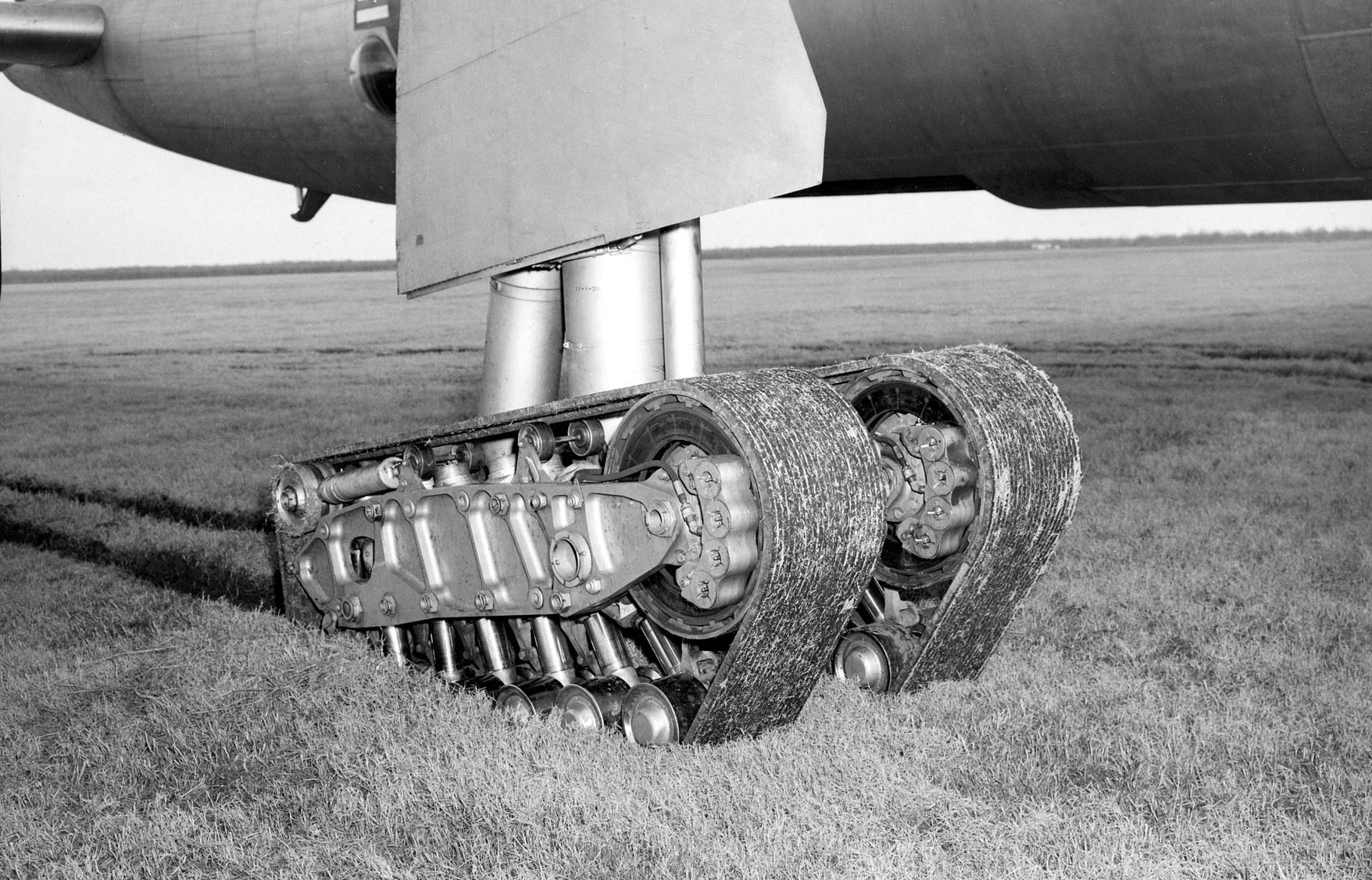
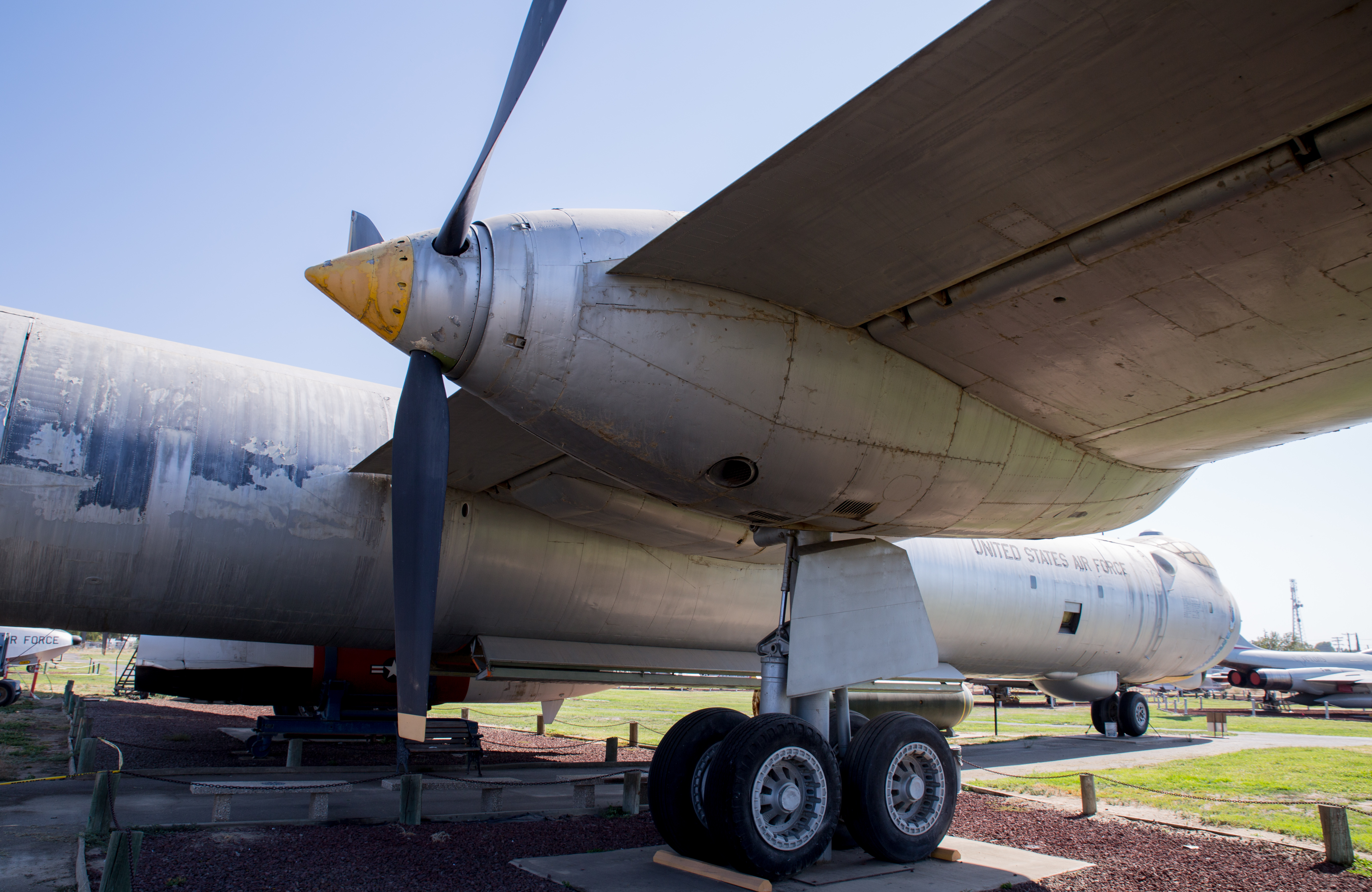
The main landing gear evolved from a single-wheel design (top) to a 4-wheel bogie (bottom), but a tracked assembly (center) was also tested.

The tricycle landing gear of the XB-36 featured a single-wheel main landing gear, whose tires were the largest ever manufactured up to that time: 9 ft 2 in (2.79 m) tall, 3 ft (0.91 m) wide, and weighing 1,320 lb (600 kg), with enough rubber for 60 automobile tires. These tires placed so much ground pressure on runways that the XB-36 was restricted to Carswell Field adjacent to the factory in Texas, Eglin Field in Florida, and Fairfield-Suisun Field in California. At one point, a tank-like, tracked landing gear was also tried on the XB-36, but it proved heavy and noisy and was soon abandoned. The single-wheel gear was soon replaced by four-wheeled bogies.

=== Weaponry ===
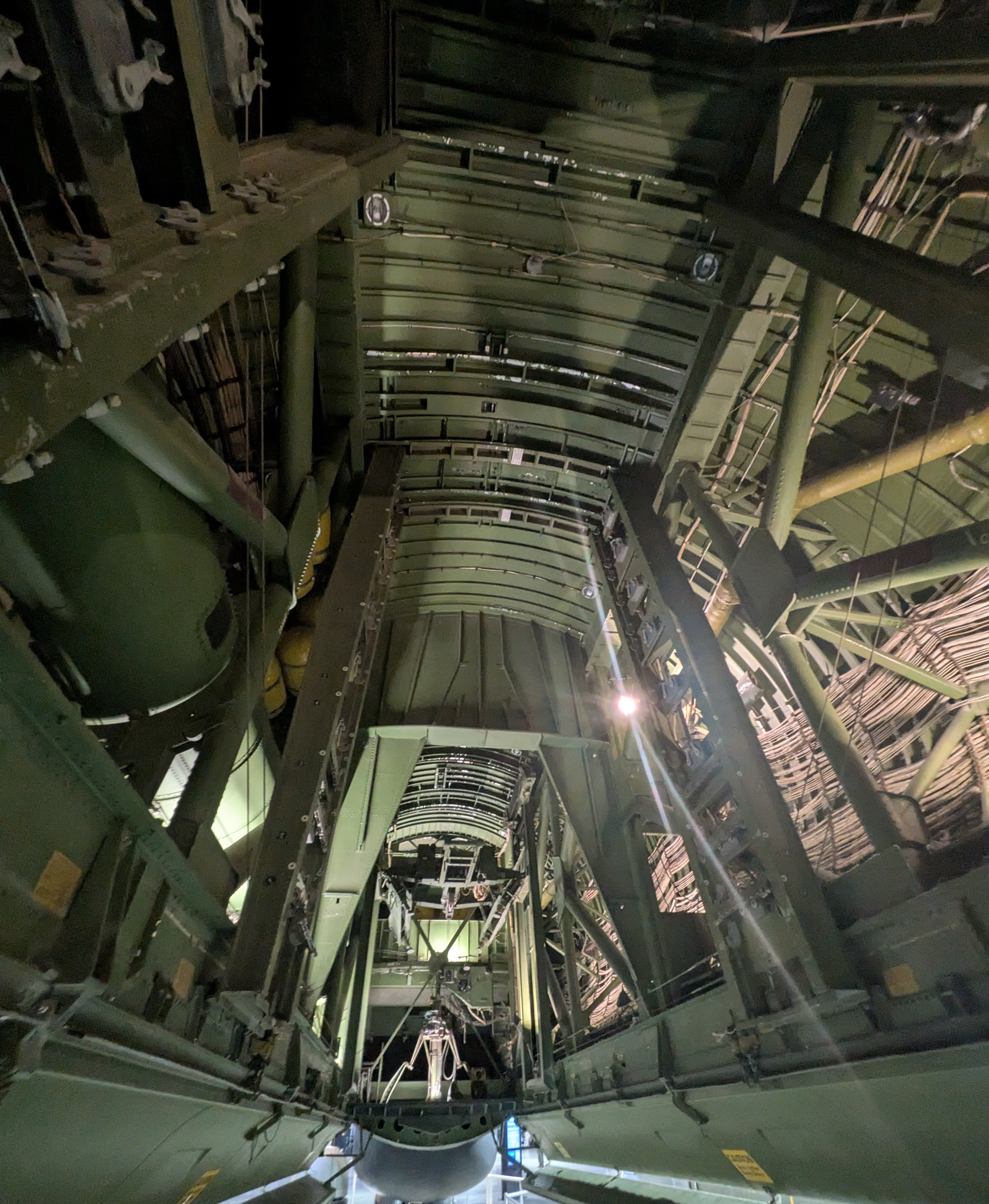
The inside of the bomb bay of the B-36 at the National Museum of the USAF

The four bomb bays could carry up to 87,200 lb (39,600 kg) of bombs, more than 10 times the load carried by the World War II Boeing B-17 Flying Fortress. The B-36 was not designed with nuclear weapons in mind, because the existence of such weapons was top secret during the period when the B-36 was conceived and designed, and the initial B-36A was not capable of accommodating them. Nevertheless, the B-36 stepped into its nuclear delivery role immediately upon becoming operational. In all respects except speed, the B-36 could match what was arguably its approximate Soviet counterpart, the later Tu-95. Until the B-52 became operational, the B-36 was the only means of delivering first-generation thermonuclear weapons, the Mark 14 (5 to 7 megatons), Mark 17, and Mark 24 (15 to 20 megatons). The Mark 17 was 25 ft (7.6 m) long, 5 ft (1.5 m) in diameter, and weighed 42,000 lb (19,000 kg), the heaviest and bulkiest American aerial nuclear bomb, taking up the aircraft's two aft bomb bays. The forward bay could hold a further Mark 6, and the aircraft could also deliver the Mark 4, Mark 5, and Mark 18 fission bombs, and the Mark 15, Mark 21, Mark 36, and Mark 39 hydrogen bombs. The defensive armament consisted of six retractable gun turrets, with side-by-side turrets mounted in forward dorsal, aft dorsal, and ventral positions, and nonretractable tail and nose turrets. Each turret was fitted with two 20 mm (0.79 in) cannons, for a total of 16; all turrets were remote-controlled. Recoil vibration from gunnery practice often caused the aircraft's electrical wiring to jar loose or the vacuum tube electronics to malfunction, leading to failures of the controls and navigation equipment, which contributed to the crash of B-36B 44-92035 on 22 November 1950.

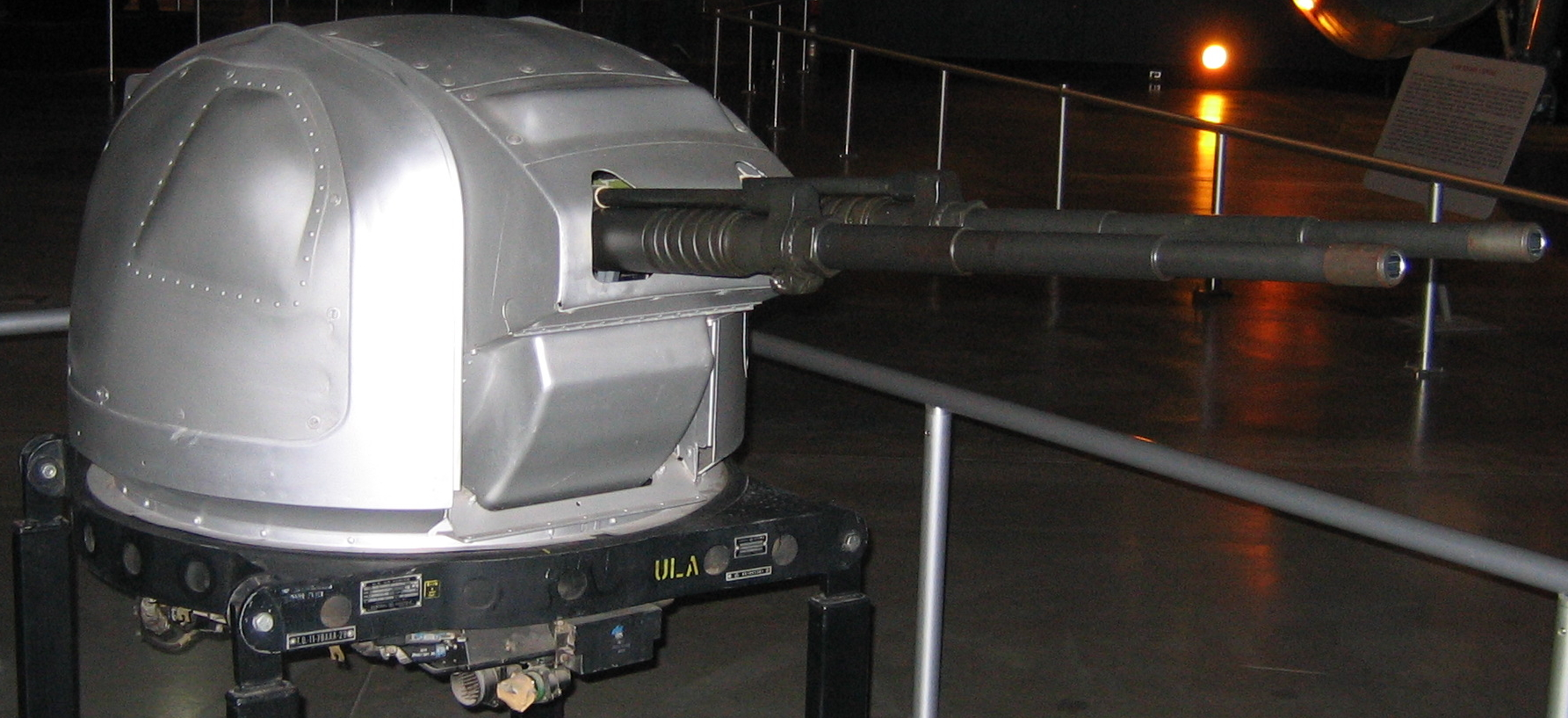
B-36 upper or lower gun turret with two M24A1 20 mm (0.79 in) cannon

The Convair B-36 was the only aircraft capable of carrying the T-12 Cloudmaker, a gravity bomb weighing 43,600 lb (19,800 kg) and designed to produce an earthquake bomb effect. Part of the testing process involved dropping two of them in a single flight, one from 30,000 ft (9,100 m) and the second from 40,000 ft (12,000 m).

The first prototype XB-36 flew on 8 August 1946. The speed and range of the prototype failed to meet the standards set out by the USAAC in 1941. This was expected, as the Pratt & Whitney R-4360 engines required were not yet available.

A second aircraft, the YB-36, flew on 4 December 1947. It had a redesigned, high-visibility, yet still heavily framed, greenhouse dome-shaped canopy, which was later adopted for production, and the engines used on the YB-36 were more powerful and efficient. Altogether, the YB-36 was much closer to the production aircraft.

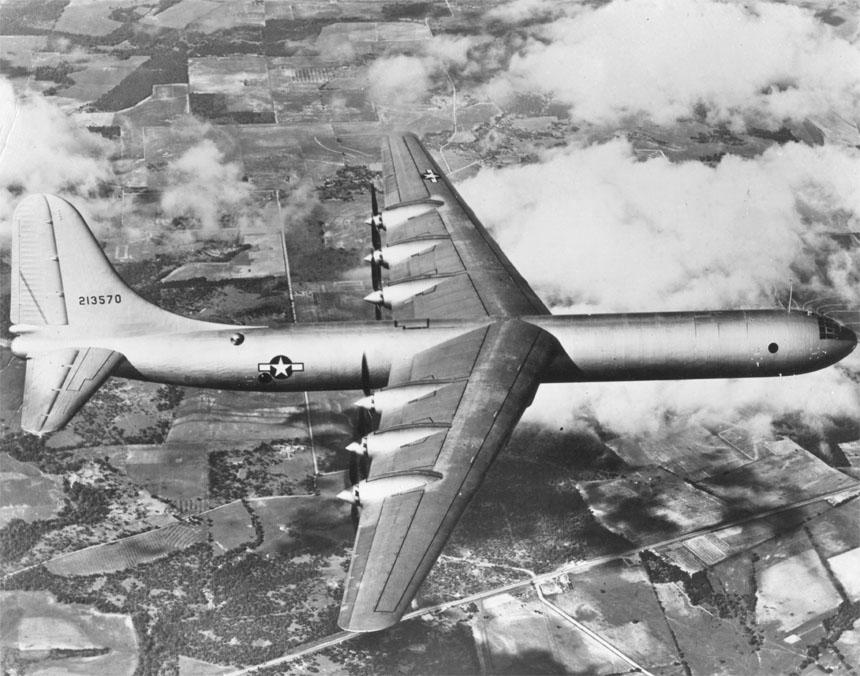
The XB-36 on its first flight

The first 21 B-36As were delivered in 1948 as interim airframes intended for crew training. No defensive armament was fitted, since none was ready. All surviving B-36As were converted to RB-36E reconnaissance models once later models became available. Deliveries began in November 1948 of the combat-capable B-36B, which finally met the 1941 requirements, but had serious engine reliability and maintenance problems (changing the 336 spark plugs was a task dreaded by ground crews) and with the availability of weapons and spares. Later models had more powerful R-4360 engines, improved radar, and redesigned crew compartments.

The jet engines increased fuel consumption and reduced range. Gun turrets were already recognized as obsolete, and newer bombers had only a tail turret, or no gunners at all for several years, but the development of air-to-air missiles, such as the Soviet K-5, which began test firings in 1951, eliminated remaining justifications for keeping them. In February 1954, the USAF awarded Convair a contract for a new "Featherweight" program, which significantly reduced weight and crew size. The three configurations were:

- Featherweight I removed defensive hardware, including the six gun turrets.
- Featherweight II removed the rear-compartment, crew-comfort features, and all hardware accommodating the McDonnell XF-85 Goblin parasite fighter.
- Featherweight III incorporated both configurations I and II.

The six turrets eliminated by Featherweight I reduced the crew from 15 to 9. Featherweight III had a longer range and an operating ceiling of at least 47,000 ft (14,000 m), especially valuable for reconnaissance missions. The B-36J-III configuration (the last 14 made) had a single, radar-aimed tail turret, extra fuel tanks in the outer wings, and landing gear allowing the maximum gross weight to be increased to 410,000 lb (190,000 kg).

Production of the B-36 ceased in 1954.

=== Operating and financial problems ===
Due to problems that occurred with the B-36 in its early stages of testing, development, and later in service, some critics referred to the aircraft as a "billion-dollar blunder". In particular, the United States Navy saw it as a costly bungle, diverting congressional funding and interest from naval aviation and aircraft carriers in general, and carrier–based nuclear bombers in particular. In 1947, the Navy attacked congressional funding for the B-36, alleging it failed to meet Pentagon requirements. The Navy held to the pre-eminence of the aircraft carrier in the Pacific during World War II, presuming carrier-based aircraft would be decisive in future wars. To this end, the Navy designed USS United States, a "supercarrier" capable of launching huge fleets of tactical aircraft or nuclear bombers. It then pushed to have funding transferred from the B-36 to USS United States. The Air Force successfully defended the B-36 project, and United States was cancelled by Secretary of Defense Louis A. Johnson in a cost-cutting move over the objections of both Secretary of the Navy John L. Sullivan and the Navy's senior leadership. Sullivan resigned in protest and was replaced as secretary of the Navy by Francis P. Matthews, who had limited familiarity with defense issues, but was a close friend of Johnson's. Several high-level Navy officials questioned the government's decision in cancelling the United States to fund the B-36, alleging a conflict of interest because Johnson had once served on Convair's board of directors. The uproar after the cancellation of United States in 1949 was nicknamed the "Revolt of the Admirals", during which time Matthews dismissed and forced into retirement the serving chief of Naval Operations, Admiral Louis E. Denfeld, after Denfeld's testimony before the House Armed Services Committee.

The congressional and media furor over the firing of Admiral Denfeld, as well as the significant use of aircraft carriers in the Korean War, resulted in the Truman administration subsequently ousting both Johnson and Matthews, and procuring Forrestal-class supercarriers, which were similar in size to United States, but geared towards multirole use with air wings of fighter, attack, reconnaissance, electronic warfare, early warning, and antisubmarine-warfare aircraft. Simultaneously, heavy-crewed bombers for SAC were also deemed crucial to national defense and the two systems would never again be in competition for funding.

== Operational history ==
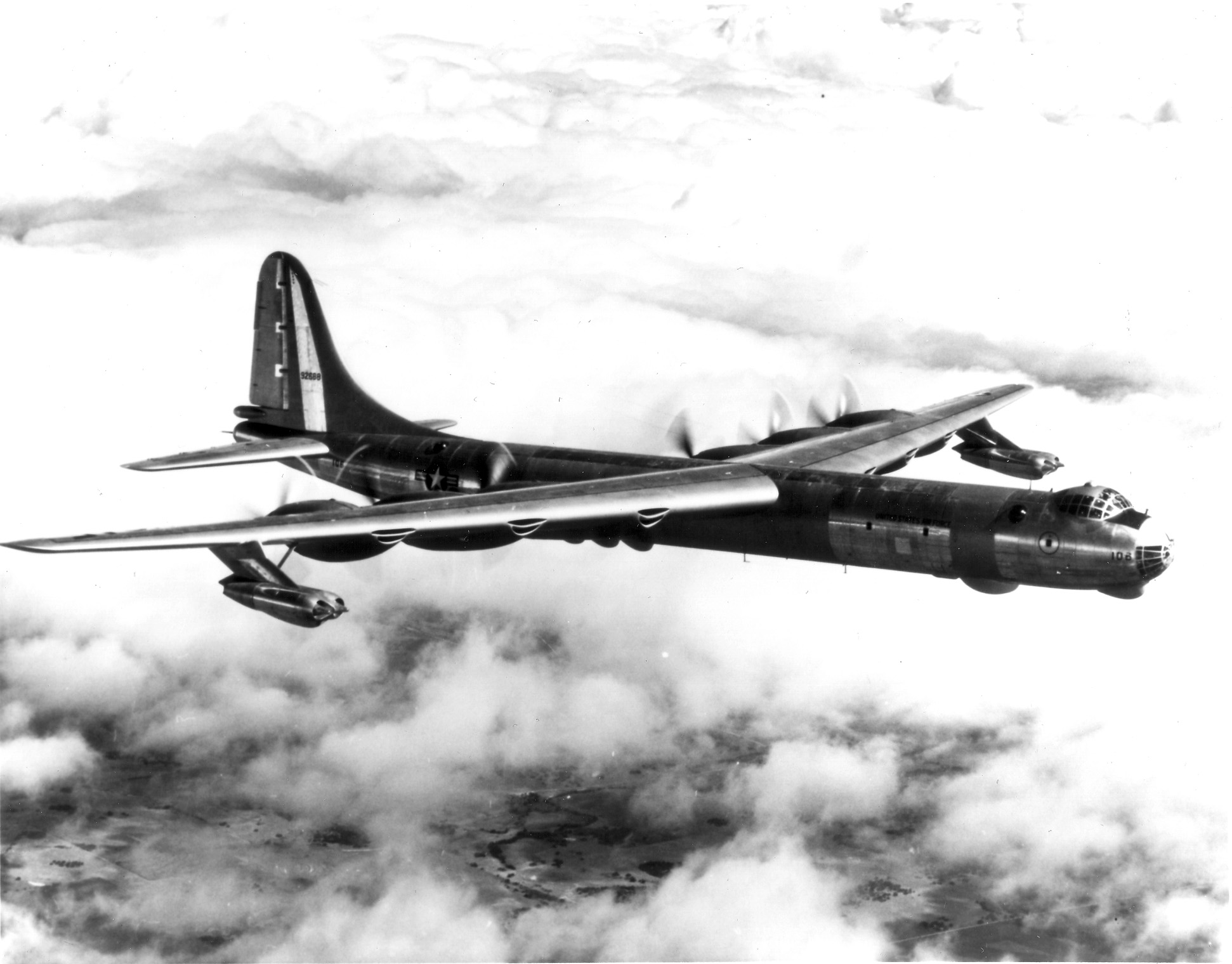
RB-36D

The B-36, including its GRB-36, RB-36, and XC-99 variants, was in USAF service as part of the SAC from 1948 to 1959. The RB-36 variants of the B-36 were used for reconnaissance during the Cold War with the Soviet Union and the B-36 bomber variants conducted training and test operations and stood ground and airborne alert, but were never flown offensively as bombers against hostile forces.

=== Maintenance ===
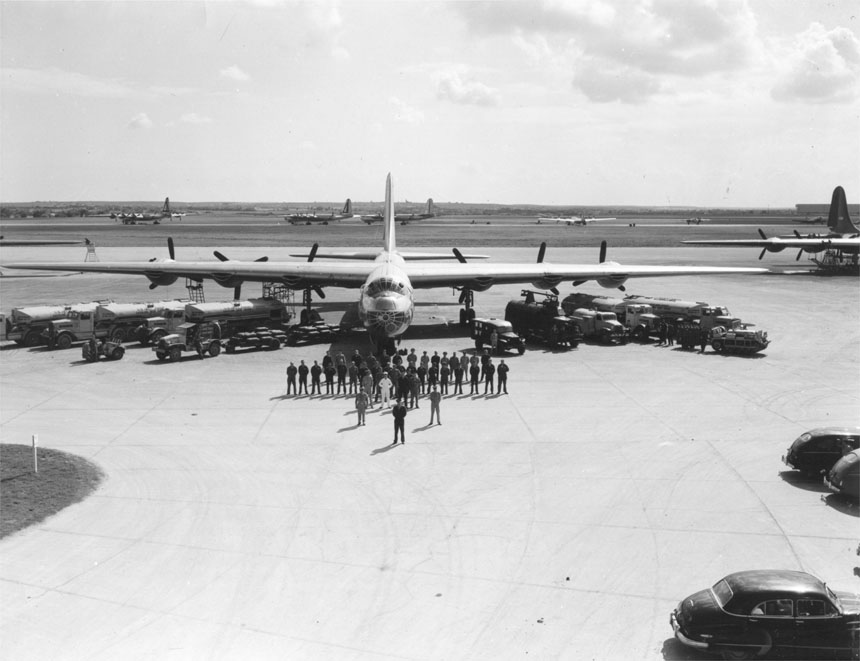
Personnel and equipment required to get and keep a B-36 aircraft in the air

The Wasp Major engines had a prodigious appetite for lubricating oil, and each engine required a dedicated 100 US gal (380 L) tank. Normal maintenance consisted of tedious measures, such as changing the 56 spark plugs on each of the six engines, which were often fouled by the lead in the 145 octane antiknock fuel required. Thus, each service required changing 336 spark plugs. The B-36 was too large to fit in most hangars. Since even an aircraft with the range of the B-36 needed to be stationed as close to enemy targets as possible, this meant the plane was largely based in the extreme-weather locations of the northern continental United States, Alaska, and the Arctic. Since the maintenance had to be performed outdoors, the crews were largely exposed to the elements, with temperatures of −60 °F (−51 °C) in winters and 100 °F (38 °C) in summers, depending on the location. Special shelters were built to provide the maintenance crews a modicum of protection. Ground crews were at risk of slipping and falling from icy wings. The wing roots were thick enough, at 7 ft (2.1 m), to enable a flight engineer to access the backs of the engines and the landing gear during flight by crawling through the wings, but this was only possible at lower altitudes.

In 1950, Consolidated-Vultee developed streamlined pods that looked like large drop tanks that mounted on each side of the fuselage to carry spare engines between bases. Each pod could airlift two engines. When the pods were empty, they were removed and carried in the bomb bays. No record exists of the pods being used.

=== Engine fires ===
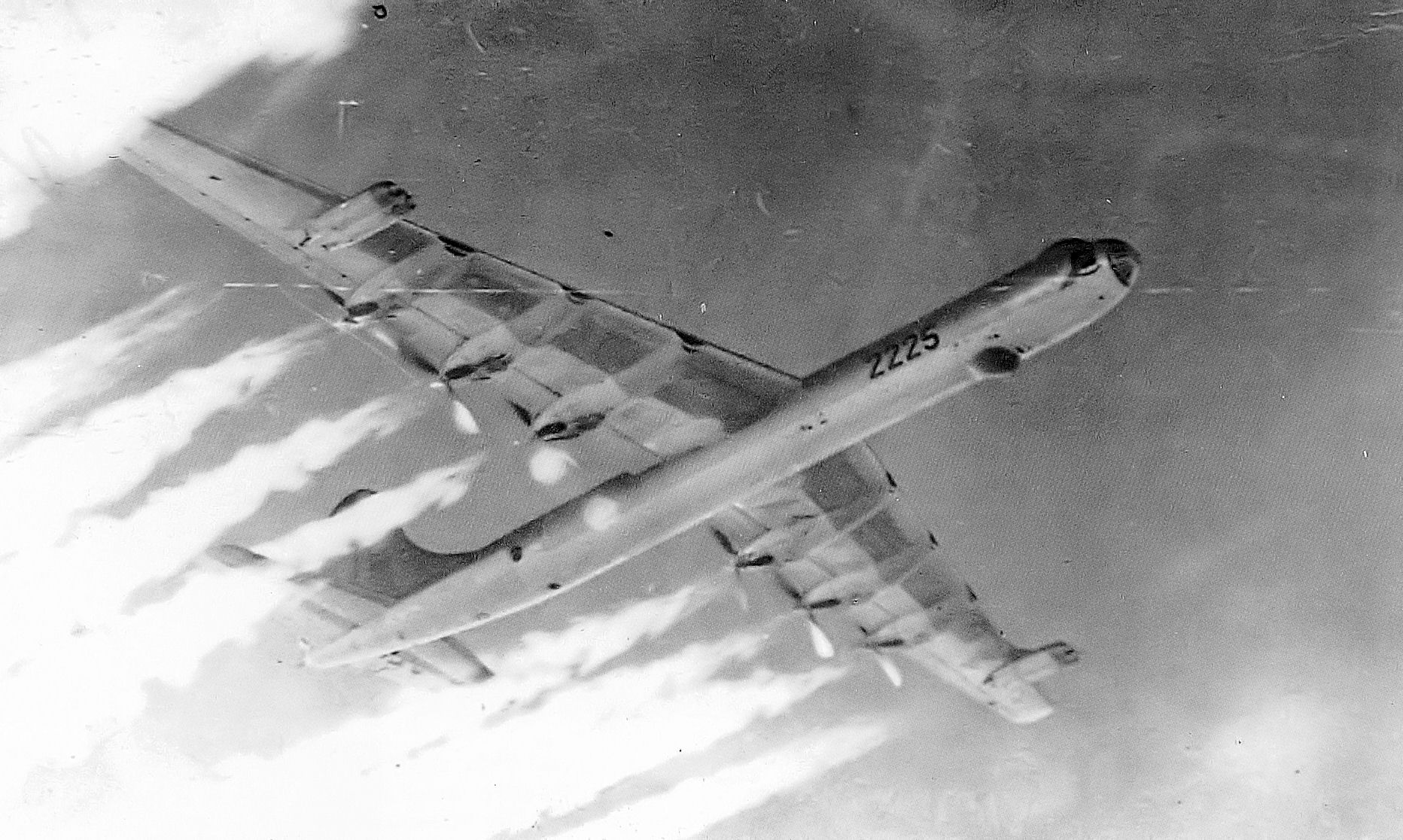
B-36J (serial 52-2225) of the 11th Bombardment Wing in 1955 showing "six turning, four burning"

As engine fires occurred with the B-36's radial engines, some crews humorously changed the aircraft's slogan from "six turnin', four burnin'" into "two turnin', two burnin', two smokin', two chokin', and two more unaccounted for". (Note: Quote attributed to Captain Banda when he was escorting Air Cadet Michael R. Daciek, later Lieutenant Colonel Daciek, on an inside tour of the XC-99 in 1953.) This problem was exacerbated by the propellers' pusher configuration, which increased carburetor icing. The design of the R-4360 engine tacitly assumed that it would be mounted in the conventional tractor configuration with the air flowing in the order of propeller/air intake/cylinders and to the carburetor. In this configuration, the carburetor is bathed in warm air flowing past the engine, so is unlikely to ice up. However, they were mounted backwards in the B-36 to reduce wing turbulence. As a result, the carburetor was in front of the engine, where it would not benefit from engine heat and made most existing carburetor heat systems unsuitable. Hence, when intake air was cold and humid, ice gradually obstructed the carburetor intake, which increased the air/fuel mixture richness until unburned fuel in the exhaust caught fire. Three engine fires of this nature led to the first loss of an American nuclear weapon when a B-36 crashed in February 1950.

=== Crew experience ===
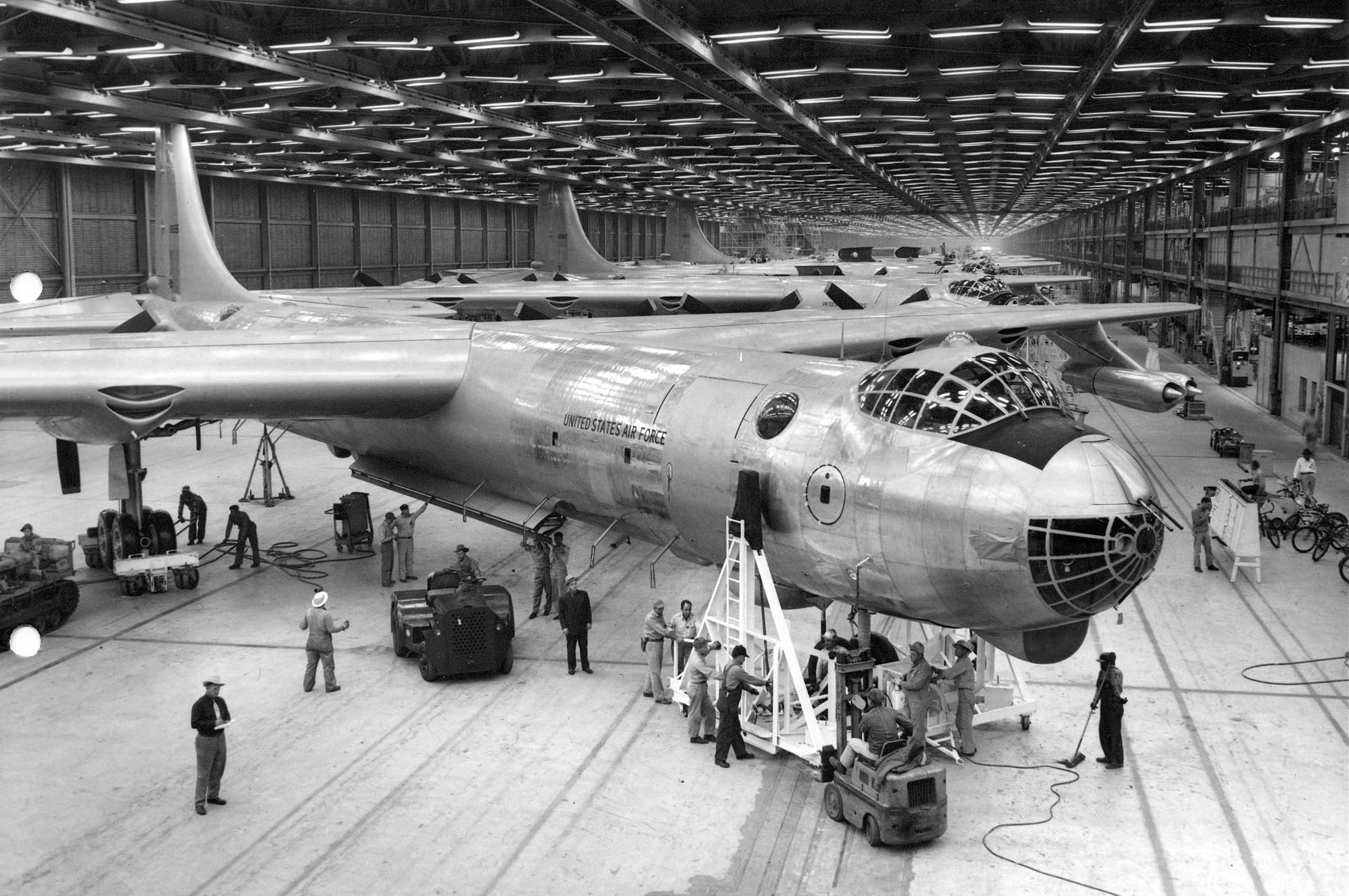
RB-36s in production: Note the heavily framed "greenhouse" bubble canopy over the cockpit area, used for all production B-36 airframes.

Training missions were typically in two parts, a 40-hour flight—followed by time on the ground for refueling and maintenance—and then a 24-hour second flight. With a sufficiently light load, the B-36 could fly at least 10,000 mi (16,000 km) nonstop, and the highest cruising speed of any version, the B-36J-III, was at 230 mph (370 km/h). Engaging the jet engines could raise the cruising speed to over 400 mph (640 km/h). Hence, a 40-hour mission, with the jets used only for takeoff and climbing, flew about 9,200 mi (14,800 km).

Due to its size, the B-36 was never sprightly or agile. Lieutenant General James Edmundson likened it to "sitting on your front porch and flying your house around". Crew compartments were nonetheless cramped, especially when occupied for 24 hours by a crew of 15.

War missions would have been one-way, taking off from forward bases in Alaska or Greenland, overflying the USSR, and landing in Europe, Morocco, or the Middle East. Veteran crews recall feeling confident in their ability to fly the missions, but not to survive weapon delivery, as the aircraft were not fast enough to escape the blast. These concerns were confirmed by the 1954 Operation Castle tests, in which B-36s were flown at combat distances from detonations of bombs in the 15-megaton range. At distances typical of wartime delivery, aircraft suffered extensive flash and blast damage.

=== Experiments ===
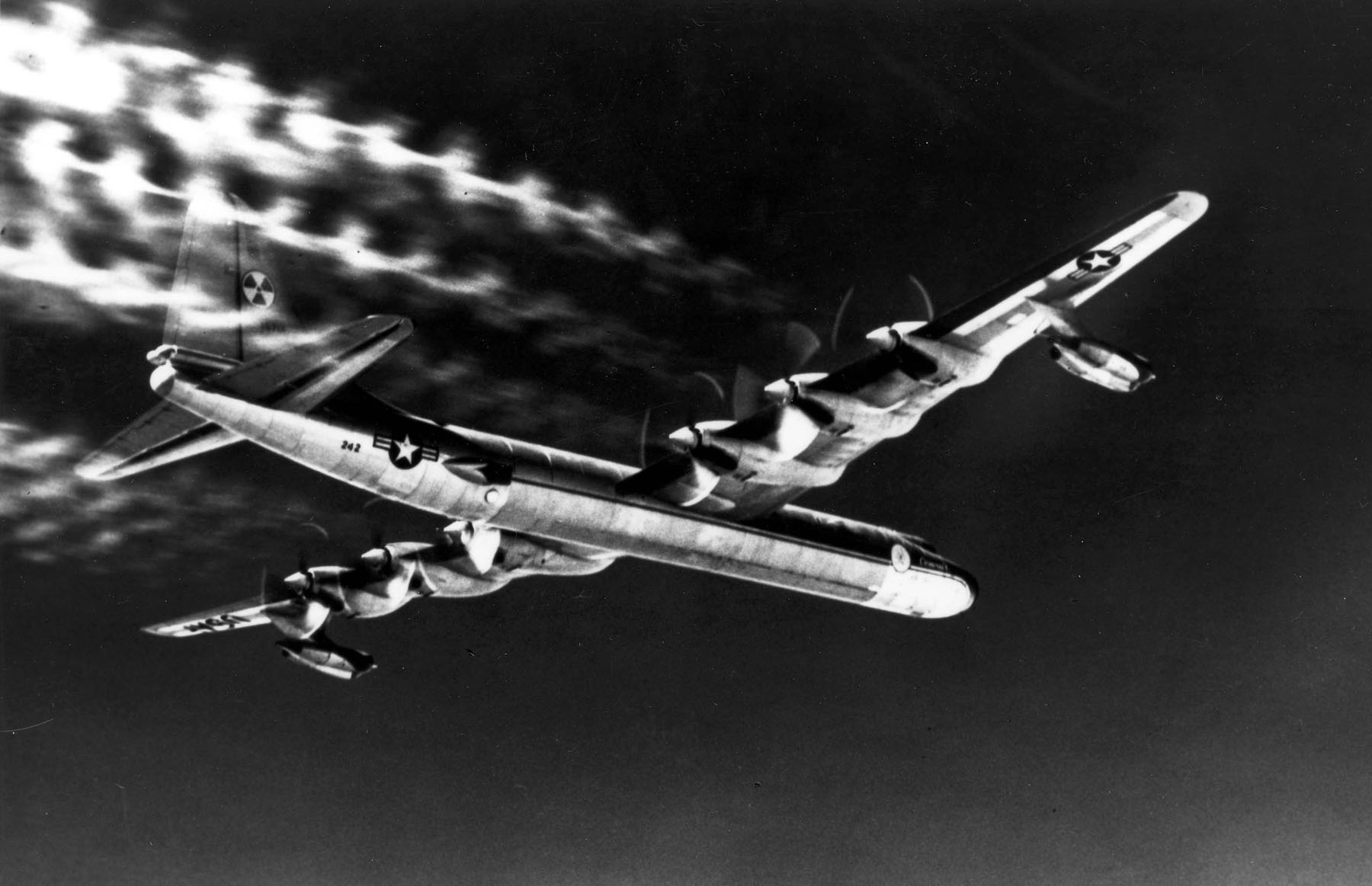
NB-36H nuclear reactor testbed

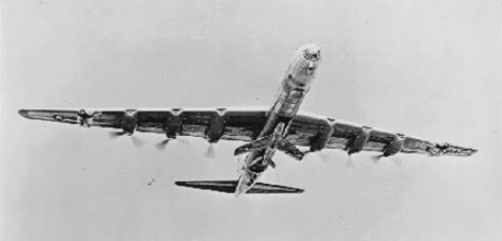
GRB-36 carrying YRF-84F modified for FICON test

The B-36 was employed in a variety of aeronautical experiments throughout its service life. Its immense size, range, and payload capacity lent itself to use in research and development programs. These included nuclear propulsion studies, and "parasite" programs in which the B-36 carried smaller interceptors or reconnaissance aircraft.

In May 1946, the Air Force began the Nuclear Energy for the Propulsion of Aircraft project, which was followed in May 1951 by the Aircraft Nuclear Propulsion program, which used modified B-36s to study shielding requirements for an airborne reactor to determine whether a nuclear-powered aircraft was feasible. Convair modified two B-36s under the MX-1589 project. The nuclear test aircraft was a B-36H-20-CF (serial number 51-5712) that had been damaged in a tornado at Carswell AFB on 1 September 1952. This aircraft, redesignated the XB-36H (and later NB-36H), was modified to carry a 1 MW, air-cooled nuclear reactor in the aft bomb bay, with a four-ton lead disc shield installed in the middle of the aircraft between the reactor and the cockpit. Several large air intake and exhaust holes were installed in the sides and bottom of the aircraft's rear fuselage to cool the reactor in flight. On the ground, a crane would be used to remove the 35,000 lb (16,000 kg) reactor from the aircraft. To protect the crew, the highly modified cockpit was encased in lead and rubber, with a 1 ft-thick (30 cm) leaded glass windshield. The reactor was operational, but did not power the aircraft, as its purpose was to investigate the effect of radiation. Between 1955 and 1957, the NB-36H completed 47 test flights and 215 hours of flight time, during 89 of which the reactor was critical.

Other experiments involved providing the B-36 with its own fighter defense in the form of parasite aircraft carried partially or wholly in a bomb bay. One parasite aircraft was the diminutive, football-shaped McDonnell XF-85 Goblin, which docked using a trapeze. The concept was tested using a B-29 carrier, but docking was difficult even for experienced test pilots. Moreover, the XF-85 was no match for contemporary foreign powers' interceptors during development or in service, and consequently the project was cancelled.

The FICON project was more successful and involved a modified B-36 (a GRB-36D "mothership") and the RF-84K, a fighter modified for reconnaissance, in a bomb bay. The GRB-36D would ferry the RF-84K to the vicinity of the objective, whereupon the RF-84K would disconnect and begin its mission. Ten GRB-36Ds and 25 RF-84Ks were built and had limited service in 1955–1956.

Projects Tip Tow and Tom-Tom involved docking F-84s to the wingtips of B-29s and B-36s. The hope was that the increased aspect ratio of the combined aircraft would result in a greater range. Project Tip Tow was cancelled when an EF-84D and a specially modified test EB-29A crashed, killing everyone on both aircraft. This accident was attributed to the EF-84D flipping over onto the wing of the EB-29A. Project Tom-Tom, involving RF-84Fs and a GRB-36D from the FICON project (redesignated JRB-36F), continued for a few months after this crash, but was also cancelled due to the violent turbulence induced by the wingtip vortices of the B-36.

The 1st Experimental Guided Missile Group tested the Republic-Ford JB-2, a derivative of the German V-1 flying bomb, in the late 1940s at Eglin Air Corps Proving Ground Eglin Air Force Base, Florida. In early 1949, the 3200th Proof Test Group tested launching JB-2s from under the wings of B-36 Peacemaker bombers at Eglin AFB. About a year later, JB-2s were tested as aerial targets for experimental infrared gunsights at Eglin.

The XGAM-71 Buck Duck was an air-launched decoy missile that was developed by Convair in the early 1950s. It was intended to have the same radar signature as the B-36, thereby allowing it to disrupt the enemy's air defenses and dilute their effort to shoot down an incoming bomber fleet. As initially envisioned by the Air Force, one B-36 in the then-typical three-plane attack formation would be filled with up to seven GAM-71s apportioned within its three bomb bays. A mixture of Ducks and other weapons was also possible, although the Air Force did not specify that it intended to use mixed loads.

=== Strategic reconnaissance ===
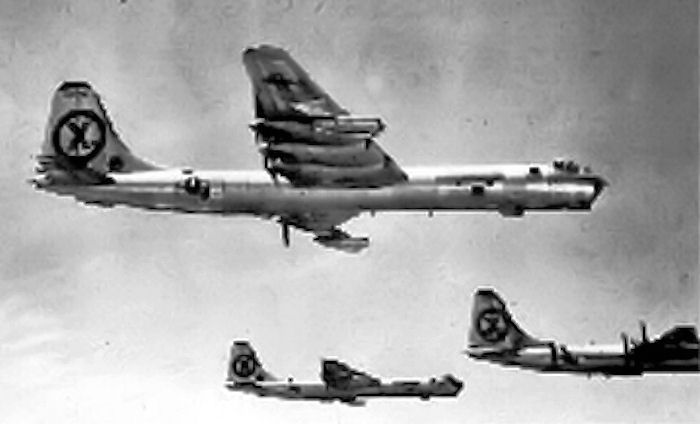
In late 1952, six 5th Strategic Reconnaissance Wing RB-36Ds were deployed to the 91st Strategic Reconnaissance Group. This was the first RB-36 used in the Korean theater. While not employed in combat, these RB-36s conducted high-altitude aerial reconnaissance over Chinese Manchuria and Soviet East Asia.

One of the SAC's initial missions was to plan strategic aerial reconnaissance on a global scale. The first efforts were in photo-reconnaissance and mapping. Along with the photo--reconnaissance mission, a small electronic intelligence cadre operated. Weather reconnaissance was part of the effort, as was long-range detection of Soviet atomic explosions. In the late 1940s, strategic intelligence on Soviet capabilities and intentions was scarce. Before the development of the Lockheed U-2 high-altitude spy plane and Corona orbital reconnaissance satellites, technology and politics limited American reconnaissance efforts to the borders, of the Soviet Union.

One essential criterion of the early postwar reconnaissance aircraft was the ability to cruise above 40,000 ft (12,000 m), a level partly determined by knowledge of the capability of Soviet air-defense radar. The main Soviet air-defense radar in the 1950s was the American-supplied SCR-270, or locally made copies, which were only effective up to 40,000 ft (12,000 m) – in theory, and an aircraft cruising above this level likely would remain undetected.

The first aircraft to put this theory to the test was the RB-36D specialized photo-reconnaissance version of the B-36D. It was outwardly identical to the standard B-36D, but carried a crew of 22 rather than 15, the additional crew members being needed to operate the reconnaissance equipment carried. The forward bomb bay was filled with a pressurized, crewed compartment with 14 cameras and a darkroom, where a photo technician would develop the film. The second bomb bay contained up to 80 T-86 photoflash bombs, while the third bay could carry an extra 11,000 L (3,000 US gal) droppable fuel tank. The fourth bomb bay carried electronic countermeasure equipment. The full defensive armament was retained. The extra fuel tanks increased the flight endurance to up to 50 hours and it had an operational ceiling of 50,000 ft (15,000 m). Later, a lightweight version of this aircraft, the RB-36-III, could reach 58,000 ft (18,000 m). RB-36s were distinguished by the bright aluminum finish of the camera compartment (contrasting with the dull magnesium of the rest of the fuselage) and by a series of radar domes under the aft fuselage, varying in number and placement. When developed, it was the only American aircraft large enough to carry the bulky, high-resolution cameras of the day.

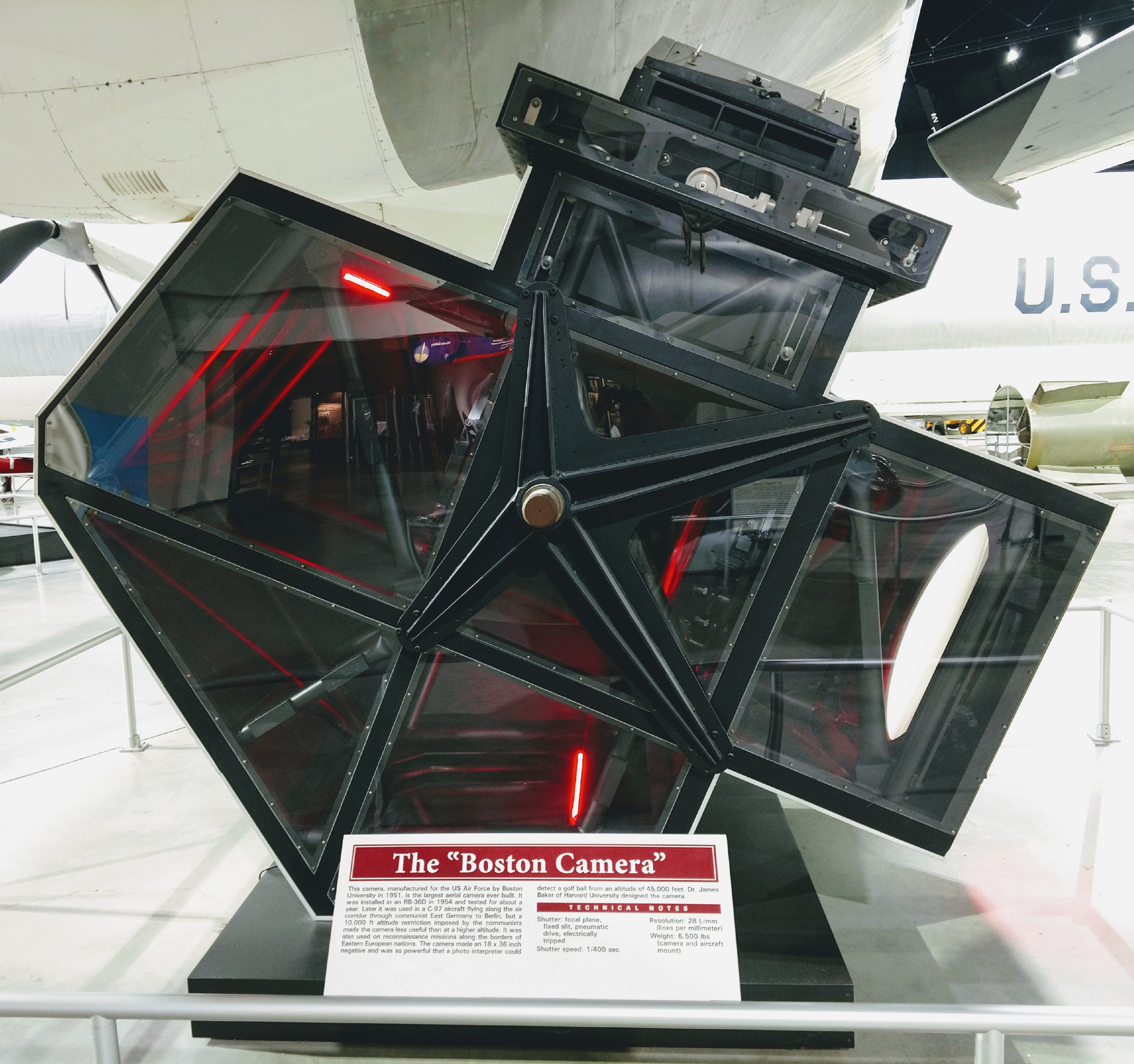
"The Boston Camera" on display at the National Museum of the Air Force

The standard RB-36D carried up to 23 cameras, primarily K-17C, K-22A, K-38, and K-40 cameras. A special 240 in (6,100 mm) focal length camera (known as the Boston Camera after the university where it was designed) was tested on 44-92088, the aircraft being redesignated ERB-36D. The long focal length was achieved by using a two-mirror reflection system and could resolve a golf ball from 45,000 ft (14,000 m) and up to 63,600 ft (19,400 m) away.

The first RB-36D (44-92088) made its initial flight on 18 December 1949, six months after the B-36D, but initially flew without turbojets. The 28th Strategic Reconnaissance Wing based at Rapid City AFB (later renamed Ellsworth AFB), South Dakota, received its first RB-36D on 3 June 1950 but due to severe material shortages, they were not operational until June 1951. The 24th and last RB-36D was delivered in May 1951. Some RB-36Ds were later modified to the featherweight configuration, in which all but the tail guns were removed and the crew reduced from 22 to 19. These aircraft were redesignated as RB-36D-III. Modifications were carried out by Convair from February to November 1954.

With a range of 9,300 mi (15,000 km), RB-36Ds began probing the Arctic boundaries of the Soviet Union in 1951. Although on-board equipment indicated detection by Soviet radar, interceptions at the B-36's service ceiling remained difficult. RB-36 aircraft operating from RAF Sculthorpe in England made a number of overflights of Soviet Arctic bases, particularly the new nuclear weapons test complex at Novaya Zemlya. RB-36s performed a number of rarely acknowledged reconnaissance missions and are believed to have frequently penetrated Chinese (and Soviet) airspace under the direction of General Curtis LeMay, and operated out of Yokota Air Base under the 91st Strategic Reconnaissance Squadron.

In early 1950, Convair began converting B-36As for reconnaissance, including the sole YB-36, which were all redesignated RB-36E. The R-4360-25 engines were replaced by R-4360-41s and were fitted with four J-47 jet engines as on the RB-36D. Its normal crew was 22, which included 5 gunners. The last conversion was completed in July 1951. The USAF later bought 73 long-range reconnaissance versions of the B-36H under the designation RB-36H. Of these, 23 were accepted during the first six months of 1952, and the last were delivered by September 1953. More than a third of all B-36s were reconnaissance models.

Advances in Soviet air defense systems limited the RB-36 to flying outside the Soviet Union, and Eastern Europe. In the mid-1950s, the jet-powered Boeing RB-47E continued to penetrate Soviet airspace and conducted a variety of spectacular and highly illegal overflights of the Soviet Union, where they took photographic and radar recordings of the routes SAC bombers would follow. Flights that involved penetrating mainland Russia were termed sensitive intelligence (SENSINT) missions.

As with the strategic bombardment versions, the RB-36 was phased out of the SAC inventory beginning in 1956, the last being sent to Davis–Monthan Air Force Base in January 1959.

=== Obsolescence ===
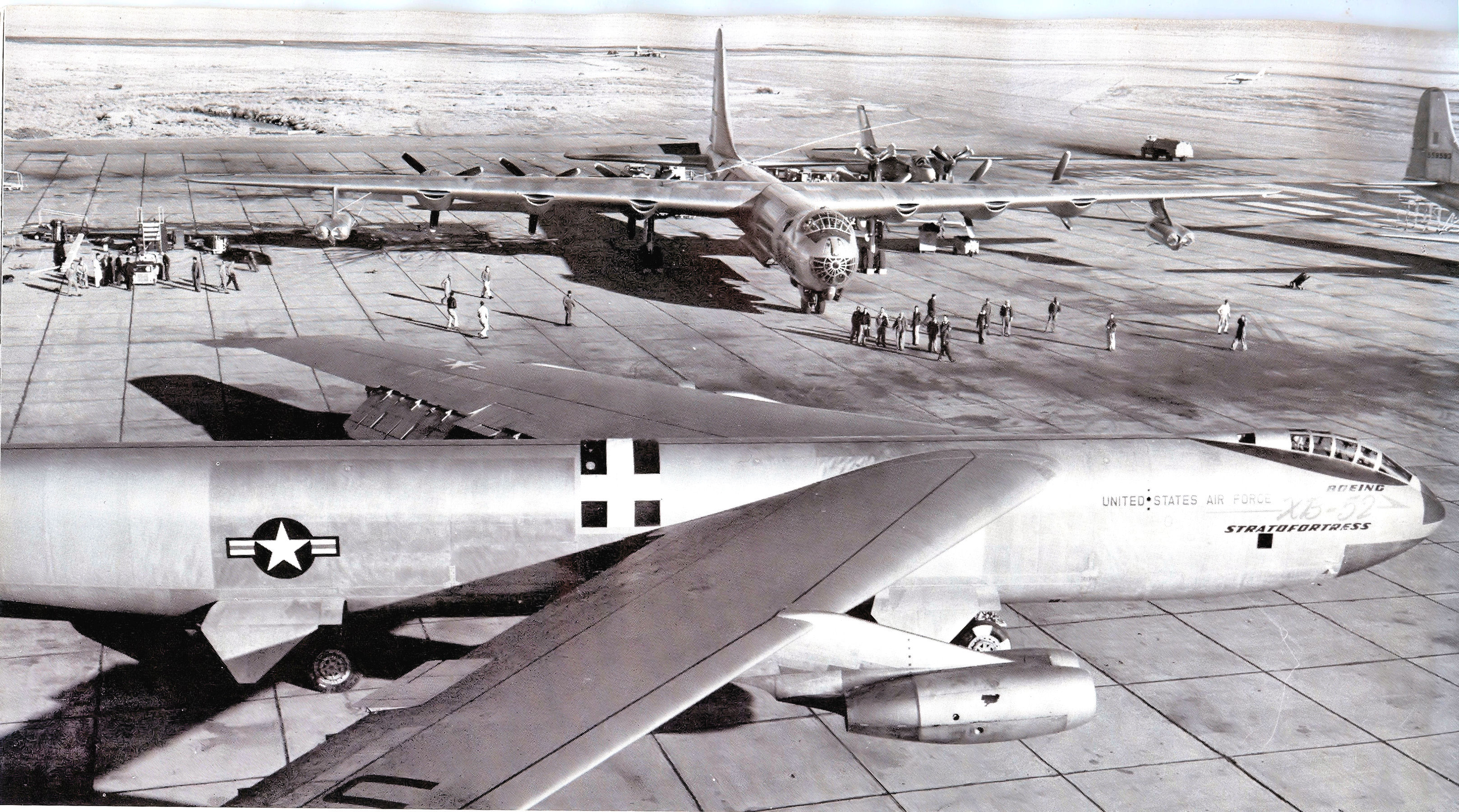
XB-52 prototype at Edwards AFB, 1955 shown with a 7th Bomb Wing B-36 and the North American XA2J Super Savage prototype behind the B-36

With the appearance of the Soviet Mikoyan-Gurevich MiG-15 over North Korea in 1950, USAF propeller-driven bombers were made obsolete as strategic offensive weapons. Both the B-36 and the B-29/B-50 Superfortresses were designed during World War II, before the jet age. A new generation of jet bombers, flying higher and faster, was needed to effectively overcome Soviet interceptors. In 1952, while fighting continued during the Korean War, the Convair YB-60, developed from the B-36, entered a design competition against the Boeing YB-52. By early 1953, the Boeing had emerged as the preferred design.

After fighting in Korea had ceased, President Eisenhower called for a "new look" at national defense. His administration retired nearly all of its SAC B-29/B-50s in favor of the new B-47 Stratojet, introduced in 1951. By 1955, the Boeing B-52 Stratofortress was entering the inventory in substantial numbers, replacing B-36s.

Two major factors contributing to the obsolescence of the B-36 and its phaseout were a lack of aerial refueling capability and its low speed which made it vulnerable to interceptors and severely decreased its ability to reach Soviet targets.

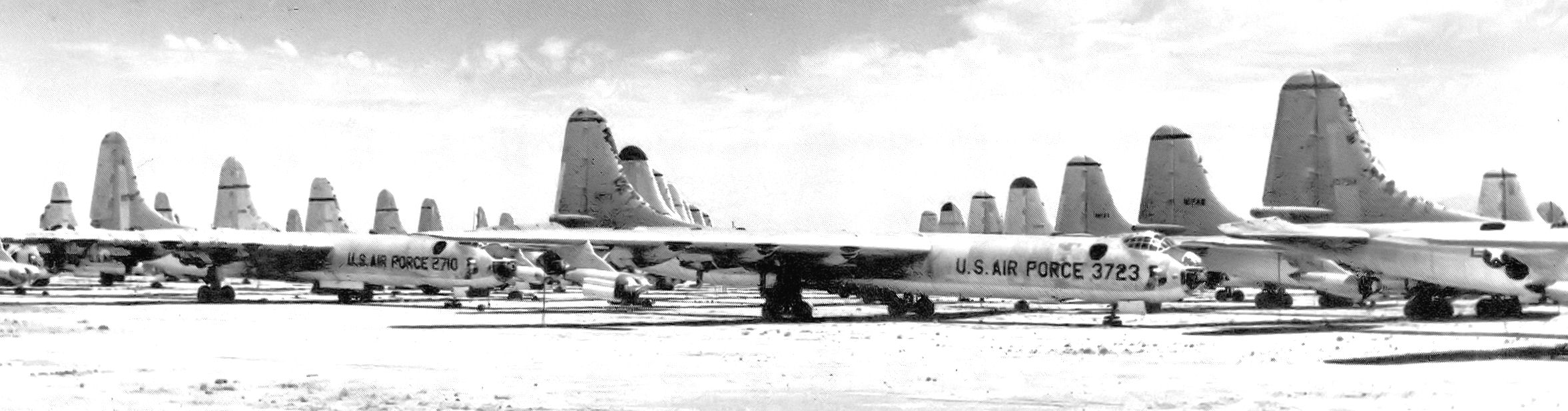
Convair B-36s awaiting scrapping at the 3040th Aircraft Storage Depot in Tucson in 1958

The scrapping of B-36s began in February 1956. Once replaced by B-52s, they were flown directly from squadrons to Davis–Monthan AFB, Arizona, where the Mar-Pak Corporation handled their reclamation and destruction. Defense cutbacks in FY 1958 stretched out B-52 procurement and B-36 service life had to be extended. B-36s still in service were supported with parts taken from aircraft sent to Davis–Monthan. Further update work was undertaken by Convair at San Diego (Specialized Aircraft Maintenance, SAM-SAC) until 1957 to extend the service life of the B-36s. By December 1958, only 22 were still operational.

On 12 February 1959, the last B-36J built, USAF Serial No. 52-2827, left Biggs AFB, Texas, where it had been on duty with the 95th Heavy Bombardment Wing, and was flown to Amon Carter Field in Fort Worth, where it was put on display. Within two years, all B-36s, except five used for museum display, had been scrapped.

== Variants ==
Variant	Built
XB-36	1
YB-36	1
B-36A	22
XC-99	1
B-36B	62
B-36D	22
RB-36D	24
B-36F	34
RB-36F	24
B-36H	83
RB-36H	73
B-36J	33
YB-60	2
Total	385

XB-36
Unarmed prototype powered by six 3,000 hp (2,200 kW) R-4360-25 engines, one built.
YB-36
Prototype, s/n 42-13571, with modified nose and raised cockpit roof, one built, later converted to YB-36A.
YB-36A
Former YB-36 with modified four-wheel landing gear, later modified as a RB-36E.
B-36A
Unarmed interim production variant, used for training, 22 built, all but one converted to RB-36E.
XC-99
A cargo/transport version of the B-36. One built.
B-36B
Armed production variant with six 3,500 hp (2,600 kW) R-4360-41 engines, 73 built, later conversions to RB-36D and B-36D.
RB-36B
Designation for 39 B-36Bs temporarily fitted with a camera installation.
YB-36C
Projected variant of the B-36B with six 4,300 hp (3,200 kW) R-4360-51 engines driving tractor propellers, not built.
B-36C
Production version of the YB-36, completed as B-36Bs.
B-36D
Same as B-36B, but fitted with four J47-GE-19 engines, two each in two underwing pods, 22 built and 64 conversions from B-36B.
RB-36D
Strategic reconnaissance variant with two bomb bays fitted with camera installation, 17 built and seven conversions from B-36B.
GRB-36D
Same as RB-36D, but modified to carry a GRF-84F Thunderstreak on a ventral trapeze as part of the FICON program, 10 modified.
RB-36E
The YB-36A and 21 B-36As converted to RB-36D standards.
B-36F
Same as B-36D, but fitted with six 3,800 hp (2,800 kW) R-4360-53 engines and four J47-GE-19 engines, 34 built.
RB-36F
Strategic reconnaissance variant of the B-36F with additional fuel capacity, 24 built.
YB-36G
Original designation of the YB-60.
B-36H
Same as B-36F with improved cockpit and equipment changes, 83 built.
NB-36H
One B-36H fitted with a nuclear reactor installation for trials, had a revised cockpit and raised nose. This was intended to evolve into the Convair X-6.
RB-36H
Strategic reconnaissance variant of the B-36H, 73 built.
B-36J
High altitude variant with strengthened landing gear, increased fuel capacity, armament reduced to tail guns only and reduced crew, 33 built.
YB-60
Originally designated the YB-36G, s/n 49-2676 and 49-2684. Project for a jet-powered swept wing variant. Due to the differences from a standard B-36 its designation was changed to YB-60.
Model 6
Proposed double-deck airliner marrying the fuselage of the B-36 with the wings and empennage of the YB-60; not built.
Fairchild M-534
Proposed conversion of two B-36Js into "Outsize Booster Carrier Aircraft", to transport stages of the Saturn V rocket. The wings, nose, and control surfaces were retained, while a massive fuselage would've been installed with a rear cargo door. The aircraft would've been over 60 feet longer, its wingspan would've been 30 feet larger, and its height would be almost doubled, standing over 92 feet tall. The design never left the drawing board.

=== Related models ===
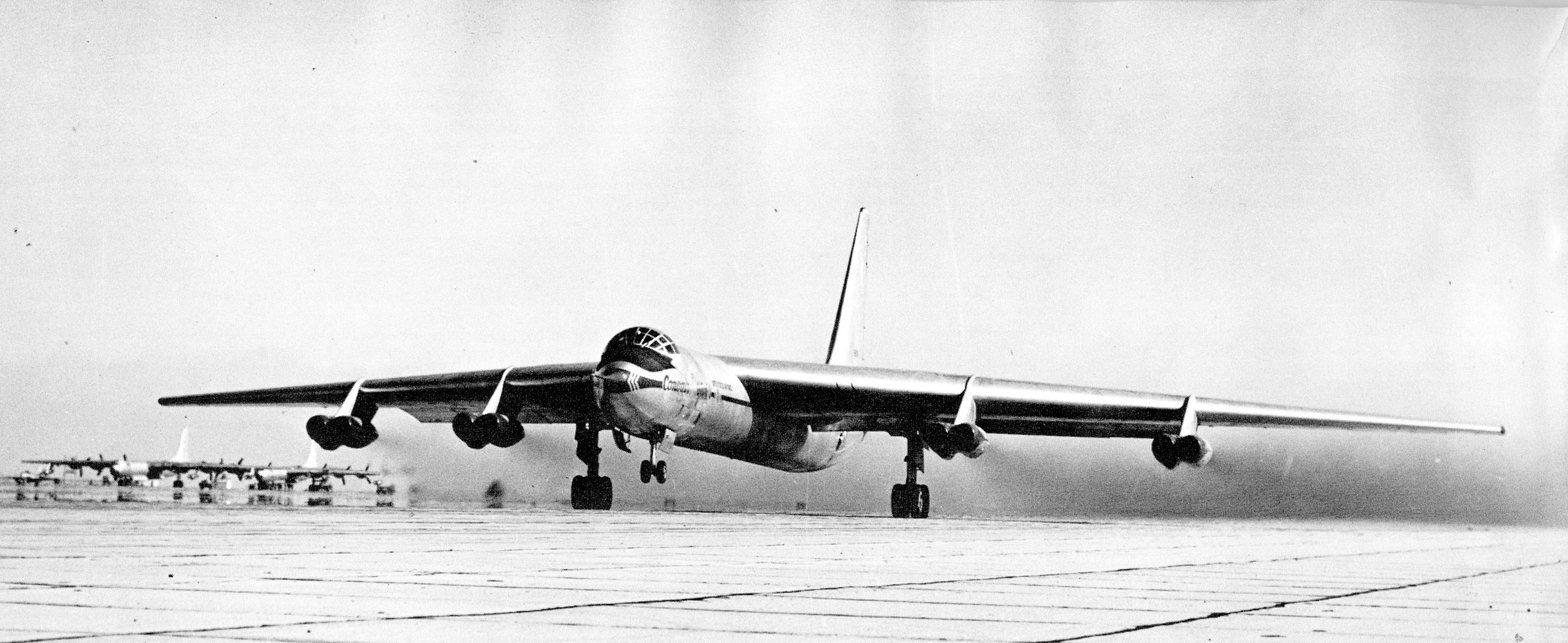
Convair YB-60-1-CF (49-2676) taking off on a test flight, 1952

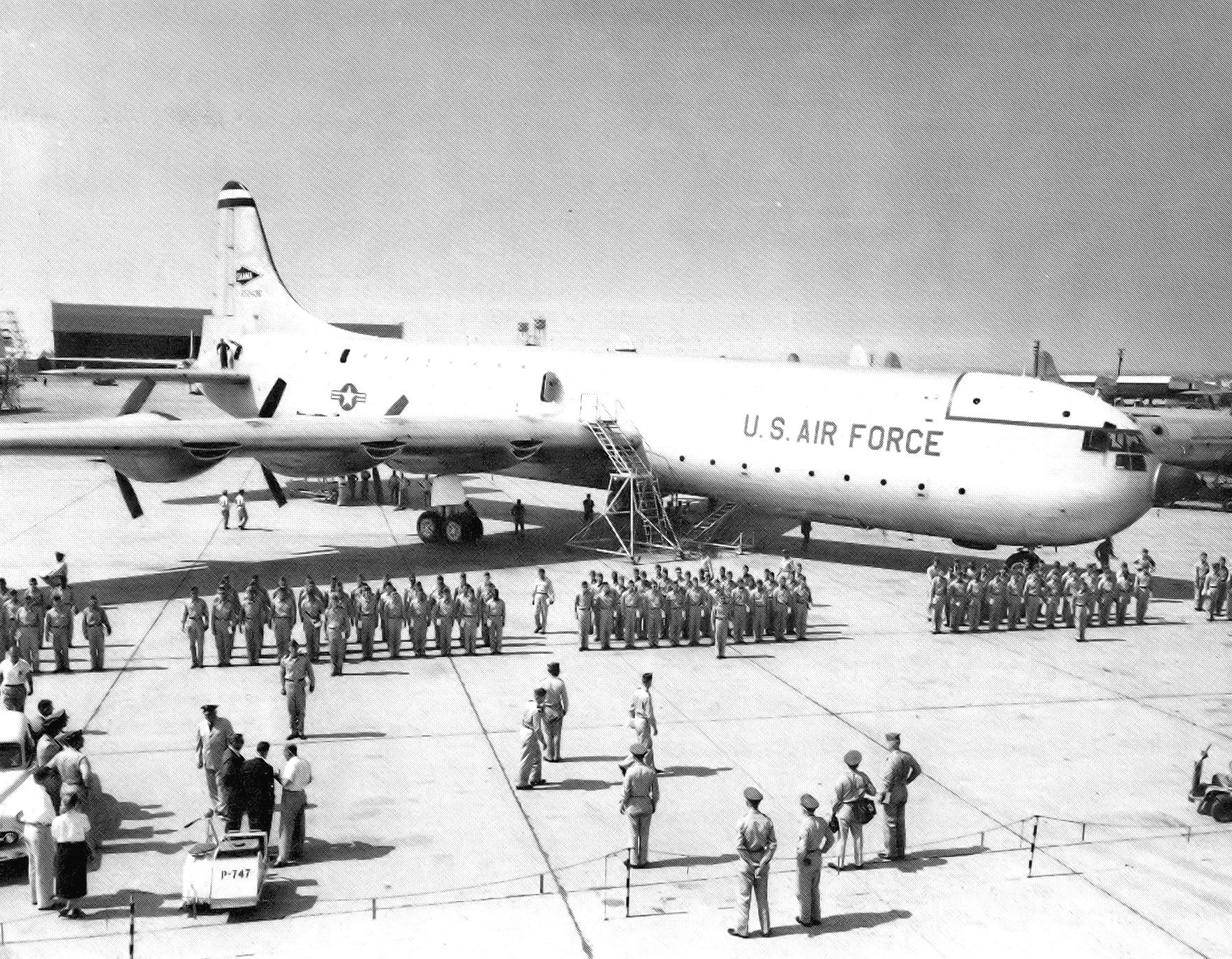
Convair XC-99 (43-52436) being delivered to Kelly AFB, Texas, 23 November 1949

In 1951, the USAF asked Convair to build an all-jet B-36. Convair replaced a B-36F's wings with swept wings, from which were suspended eight Pratt & Whitney XJ57-P-3 jet engines. The result was the B-36G, later renamed the Convair YB-60. The YB-60 was inferior to Boeing's YB-52, and was terminated. The B-36 was the basis for the Convair XC-99, a double-decked military transport that was the largest piston-engined, land-based transport aircraft built. Its length of 185 ft (56 m) made it the longest practical aircraft of its era. The sole example was used for nearly 10 years, especially for Korean War cross-country cargo flights. In 2005, it was dismantled in anticipation of its being moved from the former Kelly Air Force Base, now the Kelly Field Annex of Lackland AFB in San Antonio, Texas, where it had been stored since 1957. The XC-99 was then moved to the National Museum of the United States Air Force at Wright-Patterson AFB for restoration, with C-5 Galaxy transports carrying XC-99 pieces there.

A commercial airliner derived from the XC-99, the Convair Model 37, never left the drawing board.

== Operators ==
United States

United States Air Force – Strategic Air Command
2d Air Force

72d Strategic Reconnaissance Wing – Ramey AFB, Puerto Rico (October 1952 – January 1959)

60th and 301st Strategic Reconnaissance Squadrons, Tail Code: Square F

8th Air Force

6th Bombardment Wing – Walker AFB, New Mexico (August 1952 – August 1957)

24th, 39th and 40th Bombardment Squadrons, Tail Code: Triangle R

7th Bombardment Wing – Carswell AFB, Texas (June 1948 – May 1958)

9th, 436th and 492d Bombardment Squadrons, Tail Code: Triangle J

11th Bombardment Wing – Carswell AFB, Texas (December 1948 – December 1957)

26th, 42d and 98th Bombardment Squadrons, Tail Code: Triangle U

28th Strategic Reconnaissance Wing – Ellsworth AFB, South Dakota (May 1949 – April 1950)

77th, 717th and 718th Strategic Reconnaissance Squadrons, Tail Code: Circle X

42d Bombardment Wing, Loring AFB, Maine (April 1953 – September 1956)

69th, 70th and 75th Bombardment Squadrons

15th Air Force

92d Bombardment Wing – Fairchild AFB, Washington (July 1951 – March 1956)

325th, 326th and 327th Bombardment Squadrons, Tail Code: Circle W

95th Bombardment Wing – Biggs AFB, Texas (August 1953 – February 1959)

334th, 335th and 336th Bombardment Squadrons

5th Strategic Reconnaissance Wing – Fairfield-Suisun AFB (later Travis AFB), California (January 1951 – September 1958)

5th, 31st and 72d Strategic Reconnaissance Squadrons, Tail Code: Circle X

9th Strategic Reconnaissance Wing – Fairfield-Suisun AFB, California (May 1949 – April 1950)

1st Bombardment Squadron

99th Strategic Reconnaissance Wing – Fairchild AFB, Washington (August 1951 – September 1956)

346th, 347th and 348th Strategic Reconnaissance Squadrons, Tail Code: Circle I

Note: SAC eliminated tail codes in 1953.

== Surviving aircraft ==
RB-36H 51-13730 at the Castle Air Museum

As of 2022 four complete B-36 type aircraft survive from the original 384 produced.

RB-36H

- AF Ser. No. 51-13730 is at Castle Air Museum at the former Castle Air Force Base in Atwater, California. Previously displayed at the former Chanute Air Force Base in Rantoul, Illinois from 1957 to 1991.

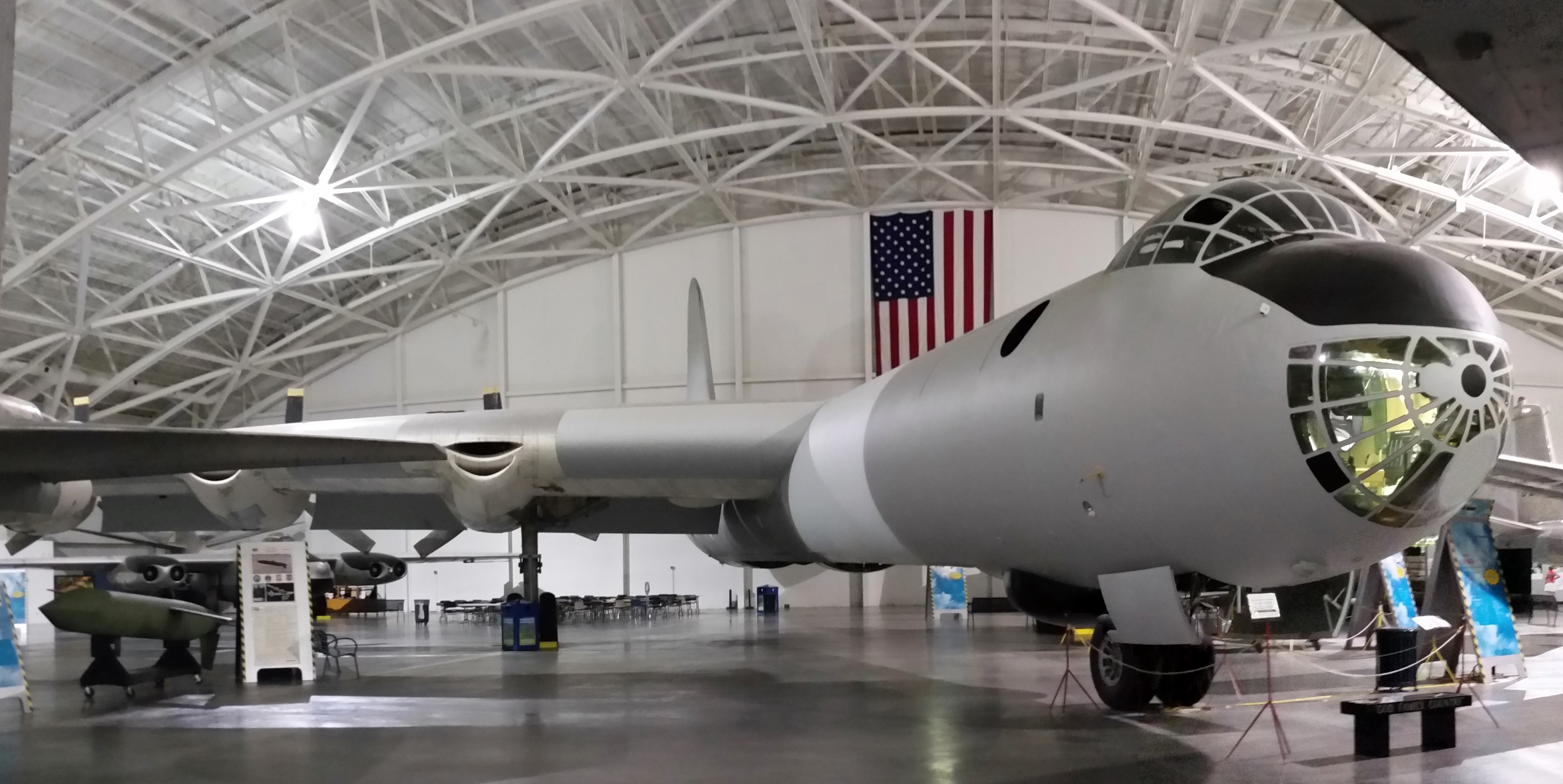
B-36J 52-2217 at the Strategic Air and Space Museum

B-36J

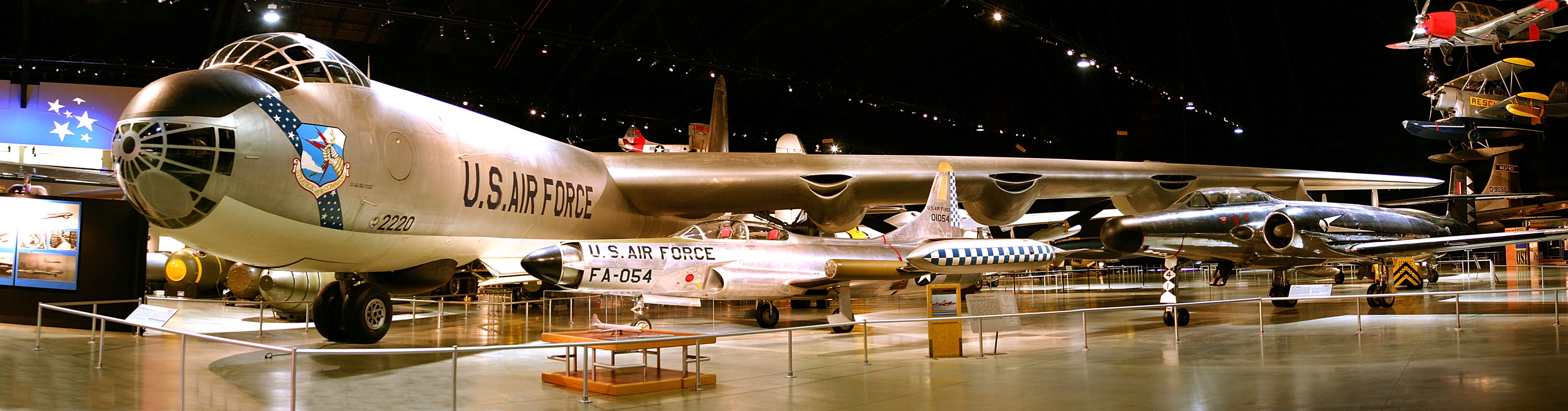
B-36J 52-2220 at the National Museum of the United States Air Force

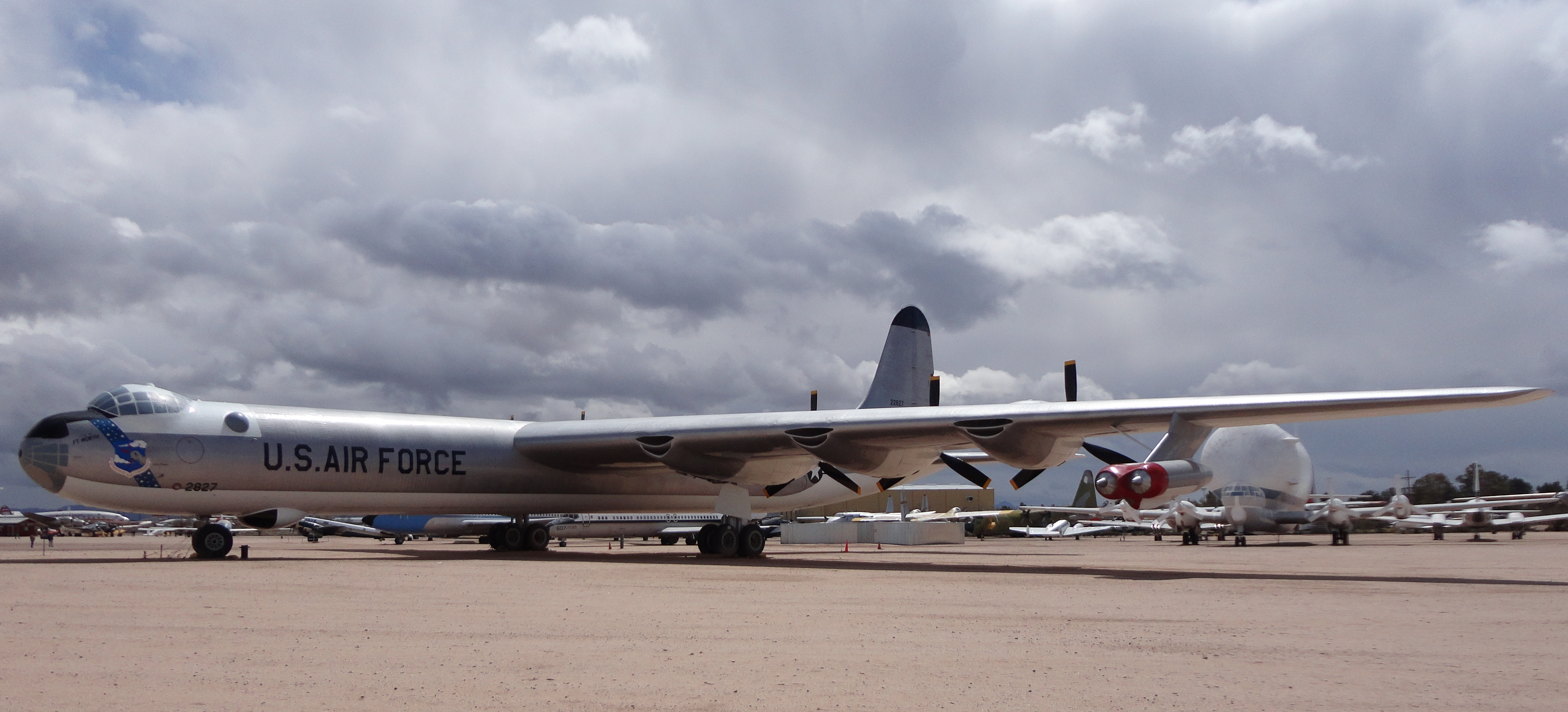
B-36J 52-2827 at the Pima Air & Space Museum

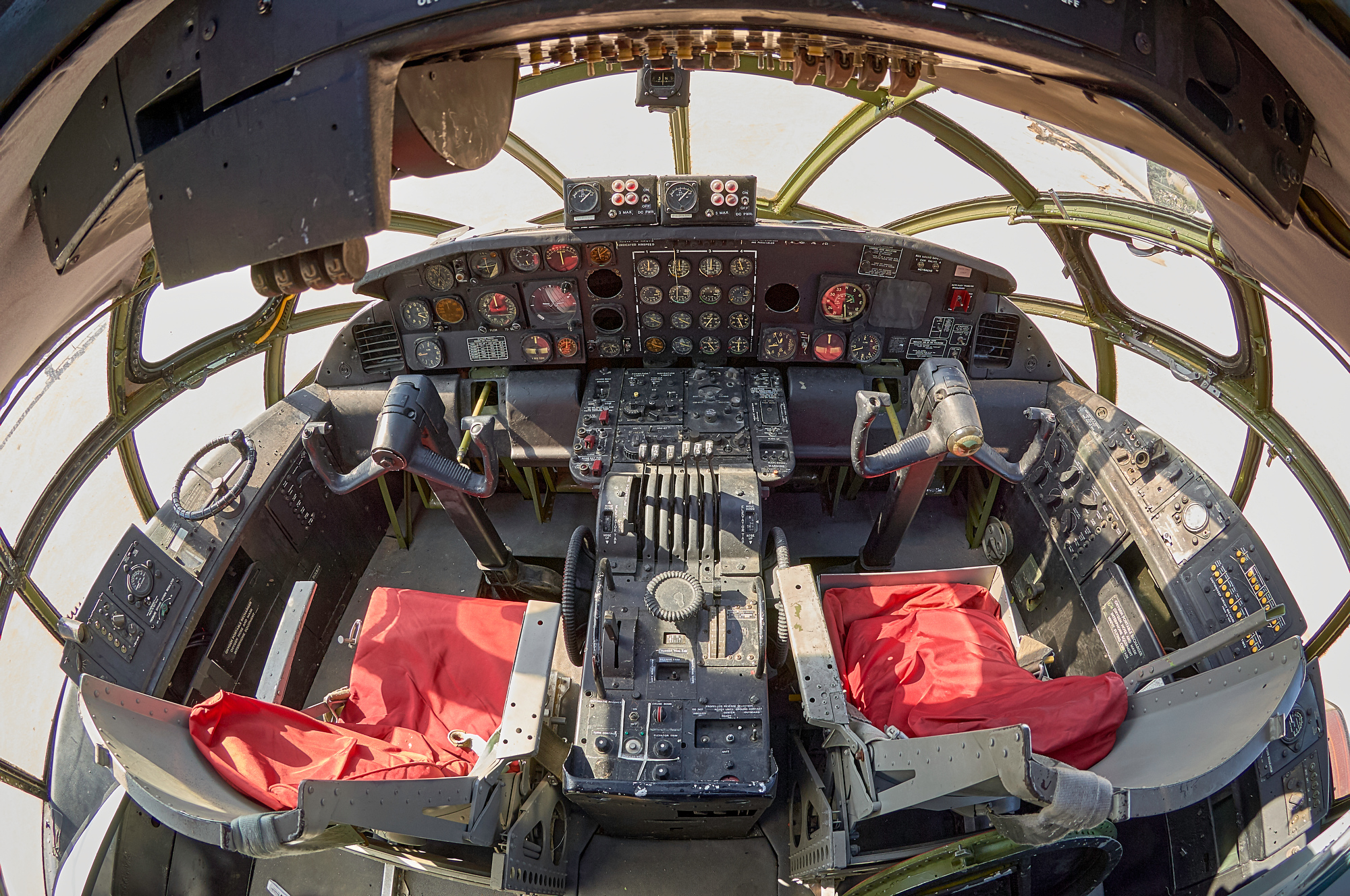
Consolidated B-36J "City of Fort Worth" unrestored flight deck

- AF Ser. No. 52-2217 is at the Strategic Air Command and Aerospace Museum, formerly at Offutt Air Force Base, and now off base near Ashland, Nebraska.
- AF Ser. No. 52-2220 is at the National Museum of the United States Air Force at Wright-Patterson Air Force Base. Its flight to the museum from Davis–Monthan Air Force Base in Arizona on 30 April 1959 was the last flight of a B-36. This B-36J replaced the former Air Force Museum's original YB-36. This was the first aircraft placed in the museum's new display hangar. It is displayed alongside the massive 9 ft (2.7 m) lower main gear strut, single wheel and tire from the XB-36.
- AF Ser. No. 52-2827 is at the Pima Air and Space Museum, adjacent to Davis–Monthan Air Force Base in Tucson, Arizona. This aircraft was the final B-36 built, named The City of Fort Worth, and lent to the city of Fort Worth on 12 February 1959. It sat on the field at the Greater Southwest International Airport until that airfield was closed and the property was redeveloped adjacent to Dallas/Fort Worth International Airport. Some attempts were made to begin restoration at that location through the early 1970s. It then moved to the short-lived Southwest Aerospace Museum, between the former Carswell Air Force Base (now Naval Air Station Joint Reserve Base Fort Worth) and the former General Dynamics (now Lockheed Martin) assembly plant, where it was originally built. Some restoration took place there. As Lockheed Martin had no room to display it, and efforts in Fort Worth to build a facility fell short, the NMUSAF repossessed the aircraft and it was transported to Tucson for loan to the Pima Air and Space Museum. It was fully restored and reassembled at that museum, just south of Davis–Monthan AFB, and is displayed there.

== Notable incidents and accidents ==
Though the B-36 had a good overall safety record, well above average for the class and time, 10 B-36s were involved in accidents between 1949 and 1954 (three B-36Bs, three B-36Ds, and four B-36Hs). A total of 32 B-36s were written off in accidents between 1949 and 1957 of 385 built. When a crash occurred, the magnesium-rich airframe burned easily.

On 14 February 1950 off the northwest coast of British Columbia on Princess Royal Island, 17 crew parachuted from their blazing B-36B; 12 crewmen were found with one injured, and five were missing.

On Labor Day, Monday, 1 September 1952, a tornado hit Carswell Air Force Base, Fort Worth, damaging aircraft of the 7th and 11th Bomber Wings' complement of B-36s. Some two-thirds of the USAF's entire B-36 fleet was damaged, as well as six aircraft being built at that point at Convair's Fort Worth plant. The base was shut down and operations transferred to Meacham Field. Joint repairs by Convair and the USAF had repaired 18 of the 19 heavily damaged aircraft (and the six damaged and unfinished aircraft at Convair) by May 1953. One example was to be scrapped, but was used as a nuclear testing site ground target. Another heavily damaged aircraft was rebuilt as the NB-36H Nuclear Reactor Testbed aircraft.

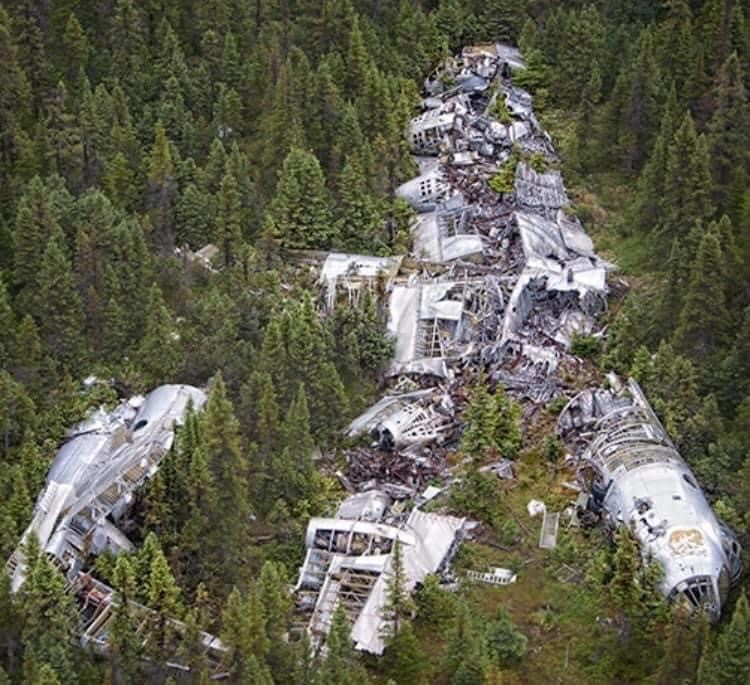
B-36 wreckage site, Goose Bay, Labrador

On February 13, 1953, Convair B-36H serial number 51-5729 crashed approximately 26 km (16 mi) southwest of CFB Goose Bay, Newfoundland and Labrador, while on approach following a transatlantic flight from RAF Fairford. The aircraft struck hilly, wooded terrain after being misaligned during the approach. The investigation determined that misguidance during a ground-controlled approach was the probable cause of the accident. Two of the 17 crew members were killed.

On the night of 17 March 1953 RB-36H-25, 51-13721 departed the Canary Islands to test North American air defenses. Change in weather conditions drove the aircraft off course, and early in the morning on 18 March the aircraft collided with a mountain on the west side of Trinity Bay (48.184352°N 53.664271°W) just north of Burgoyne's Cove, Newfoundland, Canada. All 23 crew, including Brigadier General Richard Ellsworth, were killed.

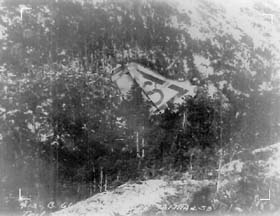
Official US Air Force accident incident photo of the 18 March 1953 crash

B-36s were involved in two "Broken Arrow" incidents. On 13 February 1950, B-36 serial number 44-92075, crashed in an unpopulated region of British Columbia, resulting in the first loss of an American atom bomb. The inert bomb's plutonium core had been replaced with lead, but it did have TNT, and it detonated over the ocean before the crew bailed out. Locating the crash site took some effort. On 4 November 2016, however, an object similar to the bomb was reported to have been found by a diver near the Haida Gwaii archipelago, 50 mi (80 km) off the coast of British Columbia. The Royal Canadian Navy deployed vessels to investigate. After investigation, the Royal Canadian Navy determined that it was not the lost bomb. Later in 1954, the airframe, stripped of sensitive material, was substantially destroyed in situ by a U.S. military recovery team.

On 22 May 1957, a B-36 accidentally dropped a Mark 17 thermonuclear bomb 4.5 mi (7.2 km) away from the control tower while landing at Kirtland Air Force Base in Albuquerque, New Mexico. The weapon had come loose from its mounts and fell through the bomb bay doors, sending the aircraft into an uncontrollable climb due to the sudden and unexpected weight shift. Only the conventional explosives detonated, as the bomb was unarmed. The aircraft made a safe landing. These incidents remained classified for decades. See list of military nuclear accidents.

== Specifications (B-36J-III) ==
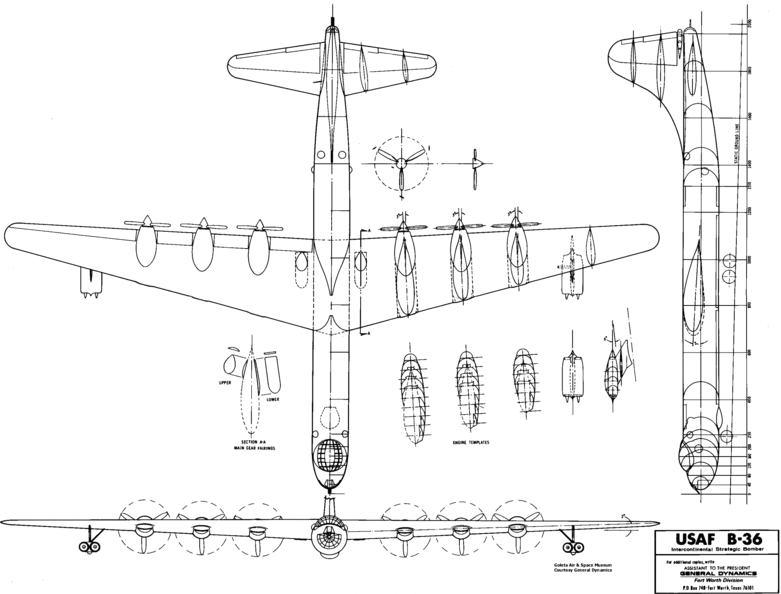
3-view line drawing of the Convair B-36

Video clip of the construction and features of the B-36 bomber

Data from National Museum of the U.S. Air Force

General characteristics

- Crew: 13
- Length: 162 ft 1 in (49.40 m)
- Wingspan: 230 ft 0 in (70.10 m)
- Height: 46 ft 9 in (14.25 m)
- Wing area: 4,772 sq ft (443.3 m^{2})
- Airfoil: root: NACA 63(420)-422; tip: NACA 63(420)-517
- Empty weight: 166,165 lb (75,371 kg)
- Max takeoff weight: 410,000 lb (185,973 kg)
- Powerplant: 6 × Pratt & Whitney R-4360-53 Wasp Major 28-cylinder 4-row air-cooled radial piston engines, 3,800 hp (2,800 kW) each for take-off
- Powerplant: 4 × General Electric J47 turbojet engines, 5,200 lbf (23 kN) thrust each in pylon mounted pods outboard of piston engines
- Propellers: 3-bladed Curtiss Electric constant-speed fully-feathering pusher propellers

Performance

- Maximum speed: 435 mph (700 km/h, 378 kn)
- Cruise speed: 230 mph (370 km/h, 200 kn)
- Combat range: 3,985 mi (6,413 km, 3,463 nmi)
- Ferry range: 10,000 mi (16,000 km, 8,700 nmi)
- Service ceiling: 43,600 ft (13,300 m)
- Rate of climb: 1,995 ft/min (10.13 m/s)

Armament

- Guns: 1 remotely operated tail turret with 2 × 20 mm (0.787 in) M24A1 autocannon
- Bombs: 86,000 lb (39,000 kg) with weight restrictions, 72,000 lb (33,000 kg) normal

== Notable appearances in media ==
In 1949, the B-36 was featured in the documentary film, Target: Peace, about the operations of the 7th Bombardment Wing at Carswell AFB. Other scenes included B-36 production at the Fort Worth plant.

Strategic Air Command is a 1955 American film starring James Stewart as a Major League Baseball star and World War II veteran who is called back to active duty to become a B-36 pilot and flight commander for SAC.

The documentary Lost Nuke (2004) chronicles a 2003 Canadian expedition that traveled to the mountain site of the 1950 British Columbia B-36 crash to find the first lost nuclear weapon.

== See also ==
- B-36 Peacemaker Museum
- Convair B-36 variants
- Lycoming XR-7755
- "Victory Bomber"
- Kégresse track

Related development

- Convair YB-60
- Convair XC-99

Aircraft of comparable role, configuration, and era

- Nakajima G10N
- Tupolev Tu-95
- Boeing XB-55

Related lists

- List of military aircraft of the United States
- List of bomber aircraft
