= B-36 Peacemaker Museum =

Non-profit organization preserving the aviation history of north Texas

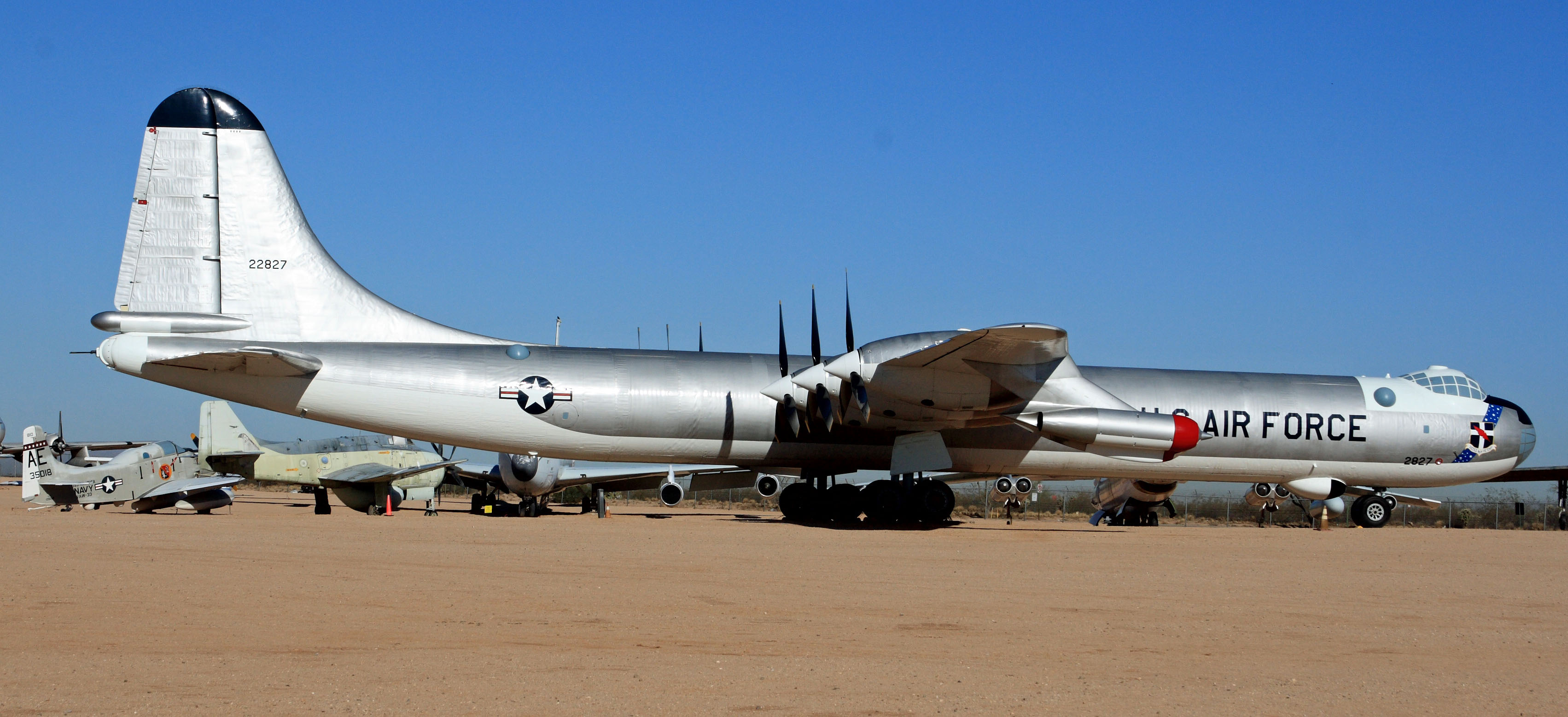
The B-36 Peacemaker 52-2827 City of Fort Worth on display at the Pima Air & Space Museum after being relocated from the B-36 Peacemaker Museum

The B-36 Peacemaker Museum is a non-profit organization "Dedicated to the preservation of the rich aviation history of North Texas".

== Original purpose of the museum ==
The museum was originally created to preserve and display the last Convair B-36 built. Of 386 B-36s built from 1945 to 1954, only four intact examples survive. B-36-J-III 52-2827 City of Fort Worth was built in Fort Worth, Texas in 1954. The aircraft was accepted by the Air Force on August 14, 1954 and was retired on 12, February 1959. It was displayed at Amon Carter Field, later Greater Southwest International Airport, from 1959 until the late 1970s, when it was moved to Carswell Air Force Base. Exposed to the extremes of Texas weather, the giant aircraft slowly deteriorated. In the early 1990s the aircraft was disassembled and moved indoors to hangar space at the factory where it was built, donated by Lockheed Aircraft. A group of dedicated volunteers, many of them retired Convair employees who had worked on the original B-36 assembly line, spent 40,000 man-hours restoring the plane.

== Transfer of the B-36 to Arizona ==
The aircraft is officially owned by the National Museum of the United States Air Force (NMUSAF), but was on loan to the B-36 Peacemaker Museum. In 2006, it was agreed that the Peacemaker Museum did not have the proper resources to restore and exhibit the aircraft, and the aircraft was trucked to the Pima Air & Space Museum (PASM) in Tucson, Arizona where it was restored and is currently exhibited. In the arid Tucson climate, it is possible to display aircraft outdoors without the kind of deterioration that occurred in Fort Worth. As the National Museum of the United States Air Force still retains ownership of the aircraft, the future direction of the B-36 Peacemaker Museum is still undecided.
