= Boston Camera =

US Air Force airborne photo reconnaissance camera

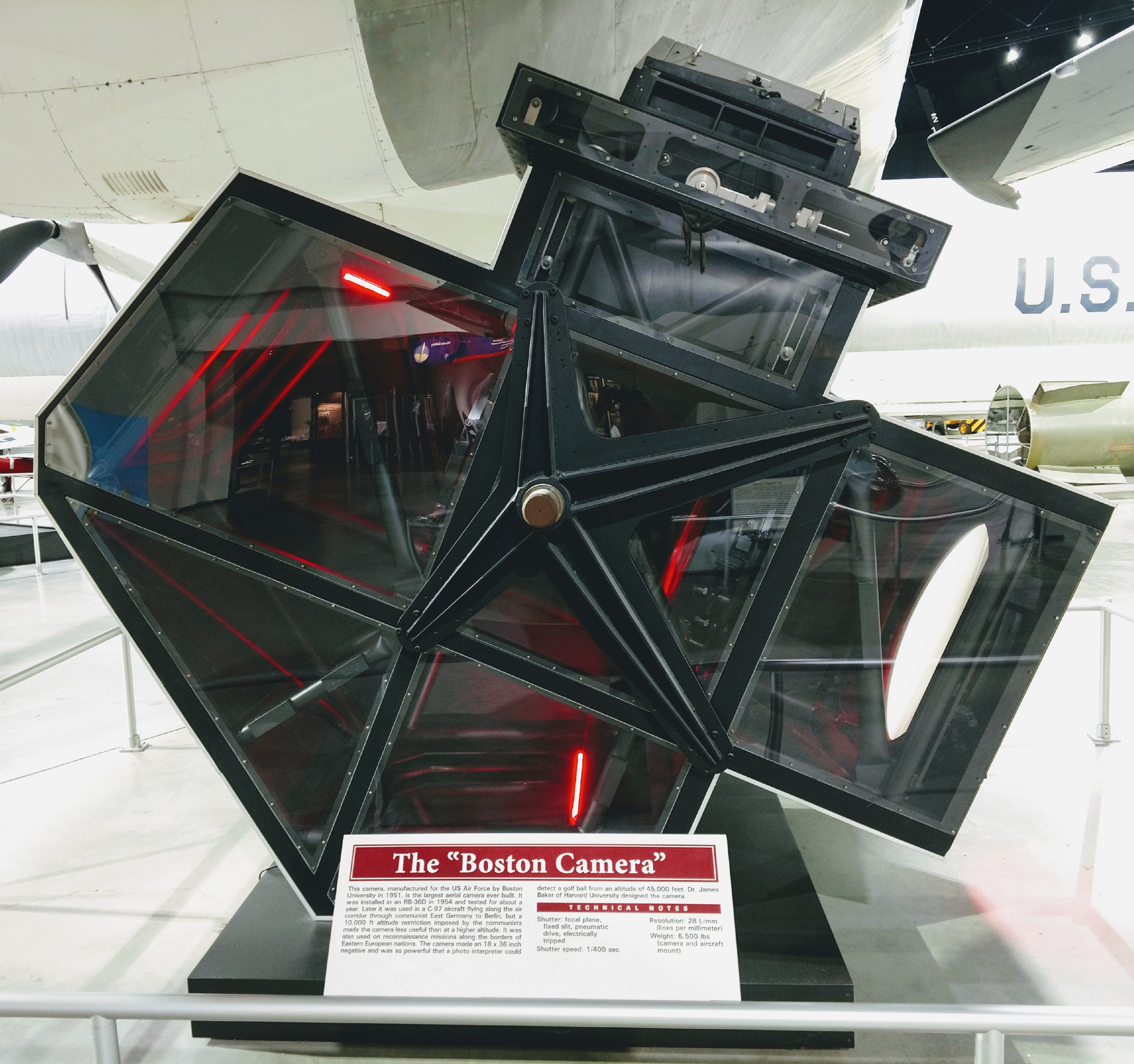
- The Boston Camera on display at the National Museum of the United States Air Force, 2019

Overview
- Maker: Boston University
- Released: 1951

Lens
- Lens: 6,096-millimetre (240.0 in)
- F-numbers: f/8 stop

Sensor/medium
- Maximum resolution: 28 lines/mm
- Film size: 18-by-36-inch (46 cm × 91 cm)

Shutter
- Shutter: Focal plane, fixed slit, pneumatic drive, electrically tripped
- Shutter speed range: 1/400 sec

General
- Weight: 6,500 lb (2,900 kg)
- Made in: United States

The Boston Camera, also known as Pie Face and officially classified as the K-42 Camera Model, was a prototype airborne photo reconnaissance camera. It was manufactured for the United States Air Force by Boston University in 1951 and was tested on the Convair B-36 and the C-97 Stratofreighter. The model carried on the first ERB-36D (44-92088), had a 6,096-millimetre (240.0 in) focal length, which was achieved using a series of lenses and mirrors. The lens had an f/8 stop and used a 1/400 second shutter speed. It could photograph a golf ball from an altitude of 45,000 feet (14,000 m). The camera used 18-by-36-inch (46 by 91 cm) negatives. The camera was installed aboard Boeing C-97A 49-2592 installation and serial number citation needed(not an "RC-97" or "EC-97" as often widely quoted) which was used operationally by the 7405th Support Squadron based at Wiesbaden, West Germany, between 1952 and 1962. It was given to the Air Force Museum in 1964, along with a contact print of a golf ball on a course.

In the words of CIA historian Dino Brugioni:

The lens was designed in 1947 by Dr. James Baker for installation in a camera designed by the Boston University Optical Research Laboratory. The camera weighed about three tons, and eight hundred pounds of lead shot were required to balance it. Supposedly, it was first installed and test-flown in an RB-36, then installed as a left-looking oblique camera in an RC-97. The first photo which Arthur Lundahl and I observed from this project was of New York City. The aircraft was seventy-two miles away, and yet we could see people in Central Park.

The Boston Camera was plagued with problems that caused it to vibrate and produce smearing on the newspaper-sized negative, so that photo interpreters would see several smeared frames along with several clear ones. It is currently displayed at the National Museum of the US Air Force in Dayton, Ohio.

From the display placard:

This camera, manufactured for the US Air Force by Boston University in 1951, is the largest aerial camera ever built. It was installed in an RB-36D in 1954 and tested for about a year. Later it was used in a C-97 aircraft flying along the air corridor through communist East Germany to Berlin, but a 10,000 ft. (3,000 m) altitude restriction imposed by the communists made the camera less useful than at a higher altitude. It was also used on reconnaissance missions along the borders of Eastern European nations. The camera made an 18 x 36 inch negative and was so powerful a photo interpreter could detect a golf ball from an altitude of 45,000 feet (14,000 m). Dr. James Baker of Harvard University designed the camera.

Technical Notes:

Shutter Speed: 1/400 sec

Weight: 6,500 lbs (3 metric ton) (camera and aircraft mount)
