= Convair B-36 Peacemaker variants =

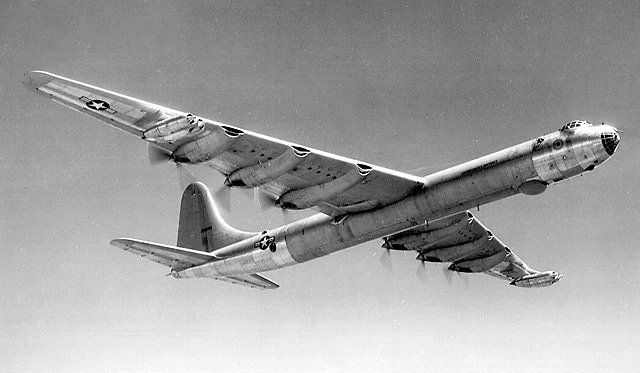
A B-36J Peacemaker in flight

The development of the Convair B-36 strategic bomber began in 1941 with the XB-36, which was intended to meet the strategic needs of the US Army Air Forces, and later of the United States Air Force with its Strategic Air Command. In 1948, the B-36 become a mainstay of the American nuclear deterrent. It underwent a number of design changes before being withdrawn from service in 1959. It was also well suited to high altitude very long range reconnaissance missions, and several alterations were made with this mission profile in mind.

== XB-36 ==
In 1941, the fall of Britain to a German invasion seemed imminent. If the United States joined the war against the Axis powers, the fall of Britain would leave no bases in Europe from which the United States Army Air Corps (AAC) could bomb Germany. This possibility led to AAC to seek a bomber of truly intercontinental range. On 1941 April 11, the AAC issued a design competition for an aircraft with a 275 mph (445 km/h) cruising speed, a service ceiling of 45,000 ft (14,000 m), capable of delivering 10,000 lb (4,500 kg) of bombs to targets 5,000 miles (8,000 km) away. At the time, these requirements far exceeded the best technology available.

In November 1941, the United States Army Air Forces signed a contract for two experimental aircraft under the designation XB-36, based on design studies previously submitted by Consolidated Aircraft Corporation. A few days later, the Engineering Division at Wright Field decided that Consolidated's six-engine design, with all engines on the trailing edge of the wing, was the best option for the aircraft. The original design used vertical stabilizers and rudders, similar to those used in the B-24 Liberator. By the time the first XB-36 was delivered, the design had been changed to a huge single tail, and the wingspan increased to 230 ft (70 m), an unprecedented size.

Variant	Built
XB-36	1
YB-36	1
B-36A	21
B-36B	62
B-36D	26
RB-36D	24
B-36F	36
RB-36F	24
B-36H	83
RB-36H	73
B-36J	33
Total	384

It was clear that the B-36 needed nose guns. Adding these required a substantial rearrangement of the cockpit. In late 1944, a mockup of the new nose was approved. Though too late for the first prototype, it would be fitted to the second XB-36. Unfortunately, the new nose with its radar and radio equipment added significant weight.

The first (and only) XB-36 was completed at the Consolidated Fort Worth factory in late 1945. The plane sat on huge wheels 9 ft (2.8 m) in diameter; only three airfields in the USA had concrete thick enough to support the pressure exerted by wheels of that size. In 1948 June, the single-wheel undercarriage was replaced by a new undercarriage consisting of two wheels with half the diameter on each strut. This design, which would become the production standard, enabled the B-36 to operate on runways of reasonable thickness.

The maiden flight revealed problems with the flap actuating system, engine cooling, and the reliability of the aluminum wiring. Propeller vibration adversely affected the wing structure. Worse yet, the XB-36 failed to meet the 1941 specifications. In particular, inadequate engine cooling kept its service ceiling under 30,000 ft (9,000 m), much less than that called for in the original contract.

Following a grounding for modifications, the XB-36 was flight tested for 160 hours by pilots of the Army Air Force Air Materiel Command, then returned to Convair for further testing.

References:

- Encyclopedia of American Aircraft
- USAF Museum

== YB-36 ==
The YB-36A, a conversion of the original XB-36, was turned over to the United States Air Force in June 1948, a week before the production B-36A was scheduled to be delivered. The YB-36A had inadequate operation value, and the Strategic Air Command used it primarily for training missions. Later it was idle for several years, then employed in the Carswell Air Force Base firefighting program.

The second prototype, designated YB-36, of which only a single instance was built, was chosen as the production version in mid-1945. Its new high-visibility cockpit and redesigned nose compartment became the standard. Thanks to various design improvements, the YB-36 outperformed the XB-36, eventually reaching altitudes of 40,000 ft (12,000 m). It was essentially built to B-36A specifications; in fact, it flew six months after the B-36A. In late 1950, the YB-36 was returned to Convair and converted into a reconnaissance aircraft under the designation RB-36E. In the spring of 1957, it was decommissioned and placed in the National Museum of the United States Air Force at Wright-Patterson Air Force Base.

References:

- Encyclopedia of American Aircraft
- USAF Museum

== B-36A ==
The B-36A included several of the new elements developed on the YB-36, including the domed canopy and the four-wheel main landing gear (as opposed to the single-wheel landing gear used on the XB-36 and the YB-36). These new features were in a sense first seen on the B-36A rather than the YB-36, because it was the former that flew first — by six months.

The first B-36A ever built was destroyed by a series of brutal stress tests, consisting mainly of applying more and more load to various parts of the aircraft until they disintegrated.

On April 8, 1948, a B-36A made a 6,922 mile (11,140 km) flight of 33 hours, shuttling between Fort Worth and San Diego three times without landing, and carrying a 10,000 lb (4,500 kg) bomb load. In May, the same aircraft did a round trip of 8,062 miles (12,970 km) lasting 33 hours.

By virtue of its designation, the B-36A was technically a production aircraft. However, it lacked defensive armament because the system wasn't ready. It was an explicitly interim plane used by the 7th Bomb Group at Carswell Air Force Base in Texas for the sole purpose of flight testing and transitional crew training. When the newer B-36B became available, all B-36As were converted to reconnaissance aircraft and redesignated RB-36E.

A total of 22 were built.

References:

- Encyclopedia of American Aircraft
- USAF Museum

== Other variants ==
B-36B
As the B-36A with R-4360-41 engines and full armament installed (sixteen 20mm cannon in eight barbettes), 73 built.
RB-36B
Designation given to 30 B-36Bs temporarily flown with camera installations.
YB-36C
Projected version of the B-36B with six 4300 hp R-4360-51 engines driving tractor airscrews, not built and the prototype on order was cancelled.
B-36C
Production version of the YB-36C, variant cancelled and the 34 on order were completed as B-36Bs.
B-36D
As the B-36B but with four 5200 lbst J-47 engines in paired underwing pods, 22 built.
RB-36D
Strategic reconnaissance variant of the B-36D with two of the four bomb-bays housing camera installations, 17 built.
RB-36E
The YB-36A and 21 B-36As converted to RB-36D standard.
B-36F
As the B-36D but with six R-4360-53 and four J-47 engines, 34 built.
RB-36F
Strategic reconnaissance variant of the B-36F with additional fuel, 24 built.
GRB-36F
One RB-36F (serial 49-2707) converted to carry a GRF-84F Thunderstreak on a central trapeze as part of the FICON (Fighter Conveyor) programme, other machines were also converted and used for trials including launching stand-off missiles.
YB-36G
Initial designation of a jet-powered version that was developed as the YB-60.
B-36H
As the B-36F but with an improved flightdeck layout and equipment changes, 83 built.
NB-36H
One B-36H (serial 51-5712) with a nuclear reactor installed in the rear fuselage for tests.
RB-36H
Strategic reconnaissance version of the B-36H, 73 built.
B-36J
As B-36H but with strengthened undercarriage and increased fuel tankage, 33 built, some aircraft flew with a reduced crew and no armament apart from the tail guns for high altitude missions
GRB-36J
Designation of a few B-36Js used for FICON testing.
YB-60
Modified version of the B-36 with swept wings and tail surfaces and powered by eight J-57-P-3 engines for evaluation against the B-52, two built.
XC-99
Transport version of the B-36 using the wings, tail surfaces and six R-4360-41 pusher engines with a two-deck fuselage for 400 troops. One built and used for trials and research from 1949 to 1957.
X-6
Projected conversion of the B-36 intended for airborne nuclear powerplant testing, following the NB-36H programme. Cancelled and none built.

== References and external links ==
- Jacobsen, Meyers K. (1997). Convair B-36: A Comprehensive History of America's "Big Stick". Schiffler Military History. ISBN 0-7643-0974-9.
- Encyclopedia of American Aircraft
- USAF Museum
