= Aircraft Nuclear Propulsion =

U.S. project 1946–1961

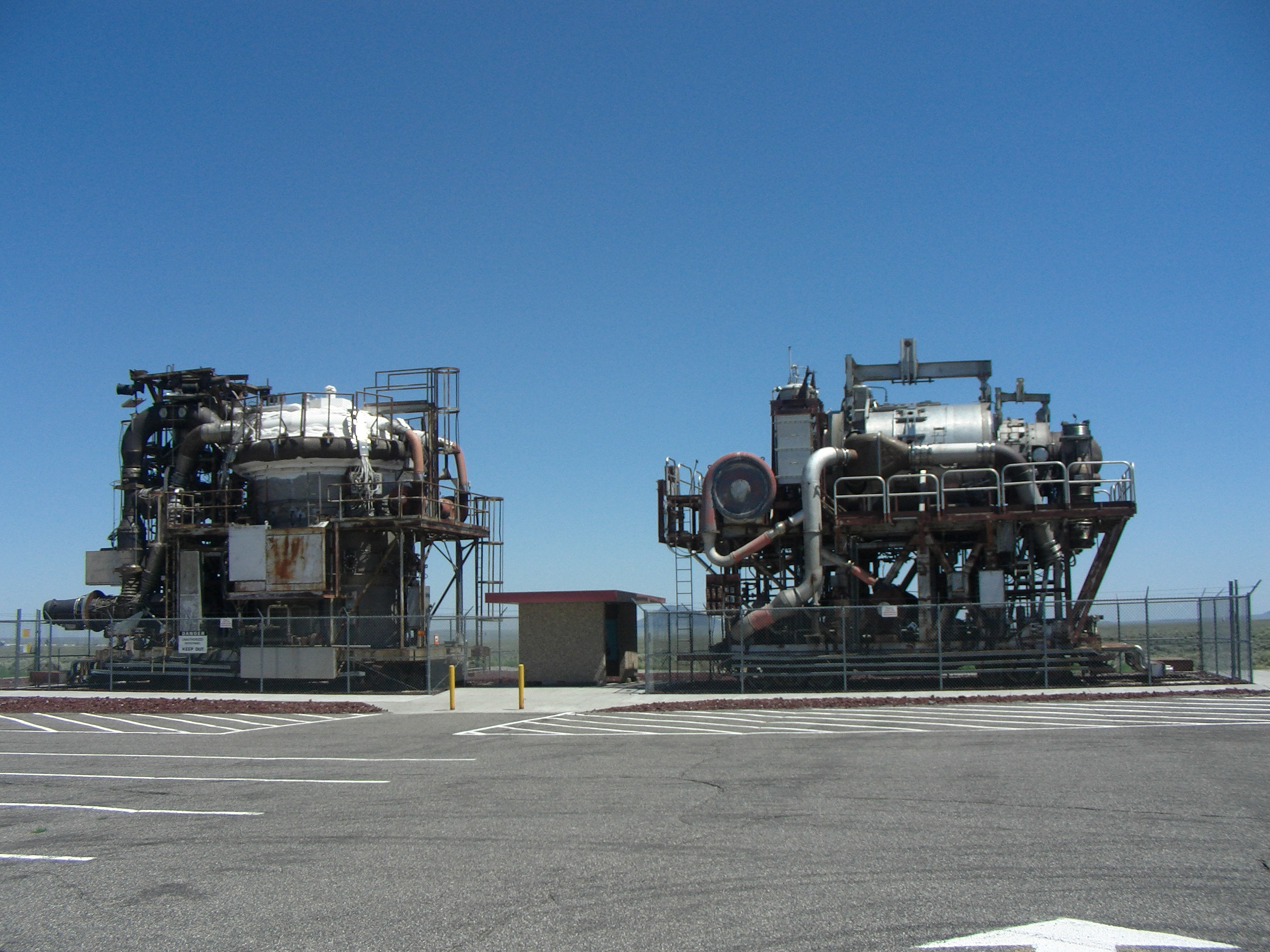
HTRE-2, left, and HTRE-3, right, on display at the Experimental Breeder Reactor I facility

The Aircraft Nuclear Propulsion (ANP) program and the preceding Nuclear Energy for the Propulsion of Aircraft (NEPA) project worked to develop a nuclear propulsion system for aircraft. The United States Army Air Forces initiated Project NEPA on May 28, 1946. NEPA operated until May 1951, when the project was transferred to the joint Atomic Energy Commission (AEC)/USAF ANP. The USAF pursued two different systems for nuclear-powered jet engines, the Direct Air Cycle concept, which was developed by General Electric, and Indirect Air Cycle, which was assigned to Pratt & Whitney. The program was intended to develop and test the Convair X-6, but was canceled in 1961 before that aircraft was built. The total cost of the program from 1946 to 1961 was about $1 billion.

== Types ==
=== Direct air cycle ===
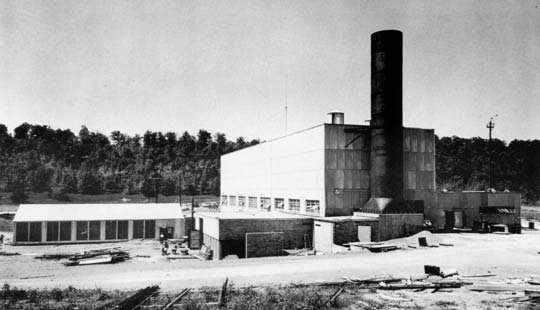
Aircraft Reactor Experiment building at Oak Ridge National Laboratory

Direct cycle nuclear engines resemble a conventional jet engine without combustion chambers. The hot compressed air produced by the compressor section is instead directed into the nuclear reactor core. The air is heated further, thereby cooling the reactor. The air is then expanded through a turbine, powering the compressor, before it is exhausted at high velocity to provide thrust. The end result is that instead of using jet fuel, an aircraft could rely on the heat from nuclear reactions.

The General Electric program, which was based at Evendale, Ohio, was pursued because of its advantages in simplicity, reliability, suitability and quick start ability. Conventional jet engine compressor and turbine sections were used, with the compressed air run through the reactor to be heated by it before being exhausted through the turbine.

=== Indirect air cycle ===
Indirect cycling involves thermal exchange outside of the core with compressor air being sent to a heat exchanger. The nuclear reactor core would heat up pressurized water or liquid metal and send it to the heat exchanger as well. That hot liquid would be cooled by the air; the air would be heated by the liquid, sent through a turbine (powering the compressor), then out the exhaust, providing thrust.

The indirect air cycle program was assigned to Pratt & Whitney, at a facility near Middletown, Connecticut. This concept would have produced far less radioactive pollution. One or two loops of liquid metal would carry the heat from the reactor to the engine. This program involved a great deal of research and development of many light-weight systems suitable for use in aircraft, such as heat exchangers, liquid-metal turbopumps and radiators. The Indirect Cycle program never came anywhere near producing flight-ready hardware.

== Experimental reactors and projects ==
=== Aircraft Reactor Experiment ===
The United States Aircraft Reactor Experiment (ARE) was a 2.5 MW_{th} thermal-spectrum nuclear reactor experiment designed to attain a high power density and high output temperature for use as an engine in a nuclear-powered bomber aircraft. The advantage of a nuclear-powered aircraft over a conventionally-powered aircraft is that it could remain airborne orders of magnitude longer and provide an effective nuclear strategic deterrent to a nuclear-armed Soviet adversary. The ARE was the first molten salt reactor (MSR) to be built and operated. It used the molten fluoride salt NaF–ZrF_{4}–UF_{4} (53–41–6 mol%) as fuel, was moderated by a hexagonal-configuration beryllium oxide (BeO), and had a peak temperature of 860 °C. A redundant liquid sodium coolant system was used to cool the moderator and reflector materials. A secondary helium gas coolant loop was circulated around the primary coolant to transfer heat to a water radiator where heat output was dumped to atmosphere. Reactivity control rods were installed and it was found that the control rods did not determine the output power of the ARE; rather, the power demand did, which affected the outlet and inlet temperatures because of the negative temperature coefficient of reactivity. The ARE was operated at power for 221 hours up to a peak of 2.5 MW_{th}.

=== MX-1589 project ===
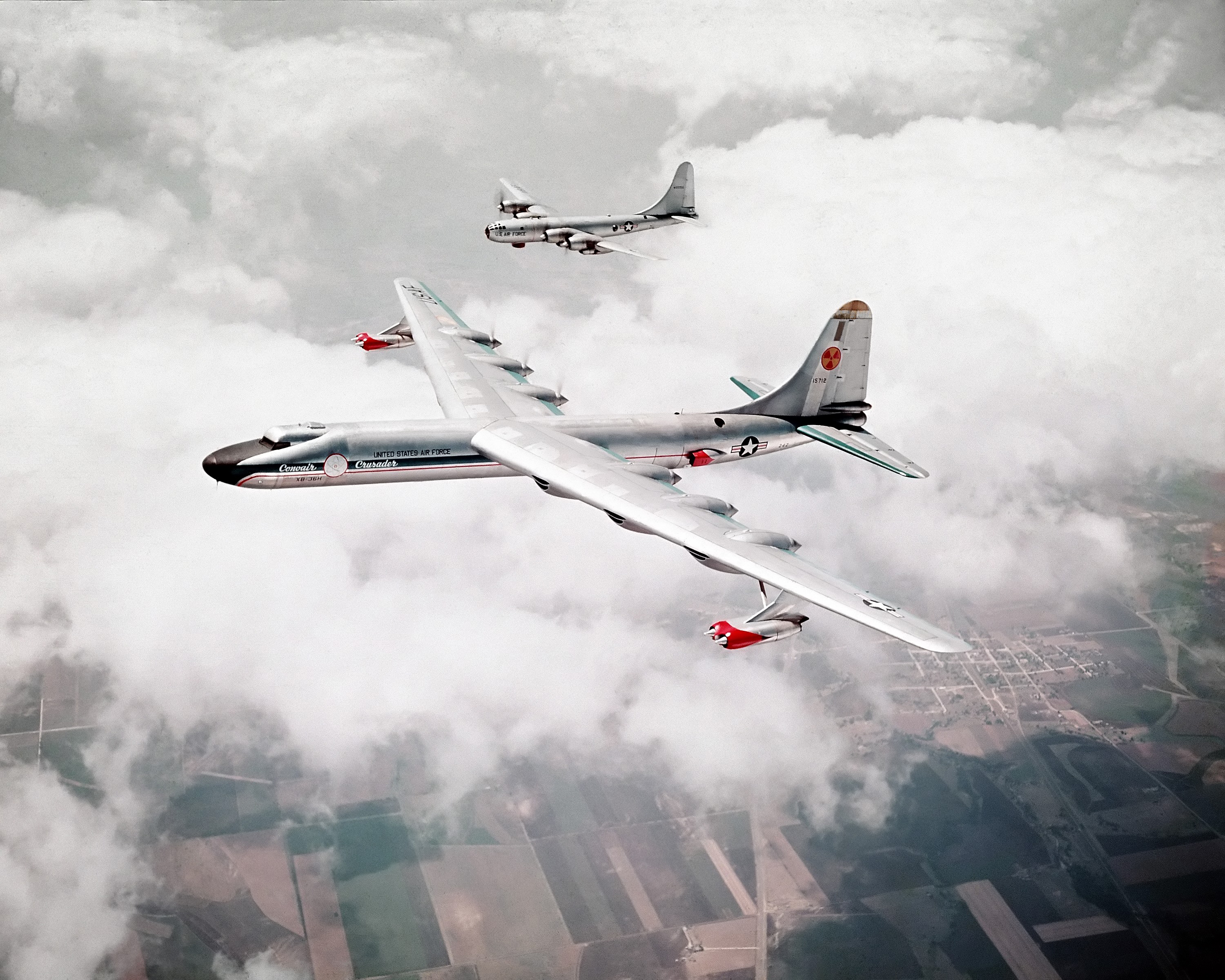
The NB-36H in a test flight, shadowed by a Boeing B-50 Superfortress

On September 5, 1951, the USAF awarded Convair a contract to fly a nuclear reactor on board a modified Convair B-36 Peacemaker under the MX-1589 project of the ANP program. The NB-36H Nuclear Test Aircraft (NTA) was to study shielding requirements for an airborne reactor, to determine whether a nuclear aircraft was feasible. This was the only known airborne reactor experiment by the U.S. with an operational nuclear reactor on board. The NTA flew a total of 47 times testing the reactor over West Texas and Southern New Mexico. The reactor, named the Aircraft Shield Test Reactor (ASTR), was operational but did not power the aircraft; the primary purpose of the flight program was testing the effectiveness of the shielding. Based on the results of the NTA, the X-6 and the entire nuclear aircraft program was abandoned in 1961.

=== Heat Transfer Reactor Experiments ===
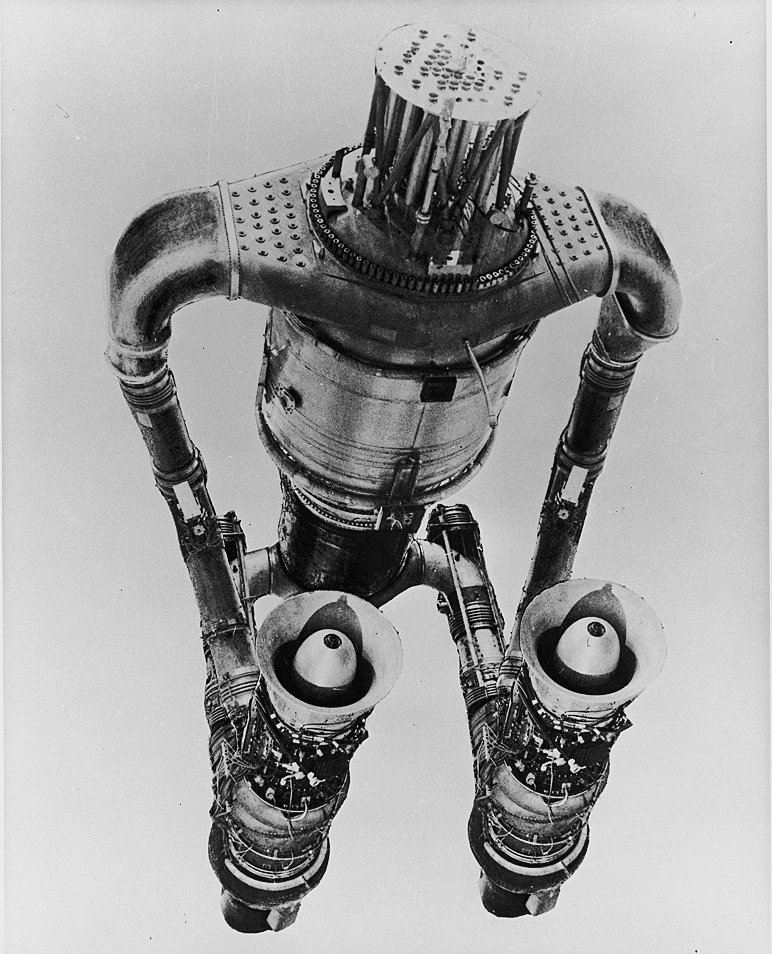
HTRE-3.

As part of the AEC/USAF ANP program, in 1956 modified General Electric J47s were first operated on nuclear power using a reactor test assembly known as Heat Transfer Reactor Experiment 1 (HTRE-1). HTRE-1, which used vertically-oriented control rods, was reconfigured with a removable core to become HTRE-2 for additional testing. HTRE-3 was built separately to test horizontally-oriented control rods as appropriate for use in an airframe.

The decommissioned HTRE-2 and HTRE-3 reactors and test assemblies can be viewed by the public in the Experimental Breeder Reactor I parking lot at Idaho National Laboratory.

=== Pratt & Whitney Aircraft Reactor-1 ===
On February 5, 1957, another reactor was made critical at the Critical Experiments Facility of the Oak Ridge National Laboratory (ORNL) as part of the circulating-fuel reactor program of the Pratt & Whitney Aircraft Company (PWAC). This was called the PWAR-1, the Pratt & Whitney Aircraft Reactor-1. The purpose of the experiment was to experimentally verify the theoretically predicted nuclear properties of a PWAC reactor. The experiment was only run briefly; by the end of February 1957 all data had been taken and disassembly had begun. The experiment was run at essentially zero nuclear power. The operating temperature was held constant at approximately 675 °C (1,247 °F), which corresponds closely to the design operating temperature of the PWAR-l moderator; this temperature was maintained by external heaters. Like the 2.5 MWt ARE, the PWAR-1 used NaF-ZrF4-UF4 as the primary fuel and coolant.

== Cancellation ==
Technological competition with the Soviet Union (as represented by the launch of Sputnik 1), and continued strong support from the Air Force allowed the program to continue, despite divided leadership between the DOD and the AEC. Numerous test facilities were funded and constructed through the 1950s and 1960–61 in order to produce a flight-worthy nuclear power unit, including one at the Oak Ridge National Laboratory (ORNL). While the ARE successfully demonstrated operation of a MSR concept, the program was canceled by President Kennedy on March 26, 1961, citing the high cost with no flight-worthy reactor having been produced up to that point – "15 years and about $1 billion have been devoted to the attempted development of a nuclear-powered aircraft; but the possibility of achieving a militarily useful aircraft in the foreseeable future is still very remote". Also contributing to the cancellation was that the first intercontinental ballistic missiles entered into active service in September 1959 which all but eliminated the need for a nuclear-powered aircraft as a strategic deterrent. Nevertheless, the results of the ARE program prompted scientists and engineers at ORNL to submit a preliminary design proposal to the Atomic Energy Commission for a 30 MW_{th} experimental MSR to explore MSR as a civilian power station concept. The result of the proposal was direction from the Atomic Energy Commission for ORNL to design, construct, and operate the Molten-Salt Reactor Experiment (MSRE).

== See also ==
- List of nuclear-powered aircraft
- Georgia Nuclear Aircraft Laboratory
- WS-125, 1955 USAF requirement for nuclear powered bomber
- NERVA
- Project Pluto to develop nuclear powered ramjet engines for use in cruise missiles
- Project Rover to develop a nuclear thermal rocket
- Tupolev Tu-95LAL
- GE Beetle - mobile manipulator built to service nuclear-powered aircraft
