= Myasishchev M-60 =

Soviet experimental bomber

The Myasishchev M-60 was a Soviet design for a nuclear-powered bomber. The design was similar to the M-50 bomber prototype.

Myasishchev received the instruction to start the development of the M-60 on 19 May 1955. However, it did not make it out of the planning stage, and the M-60 program was cancelled in 1959.

It appears that the M-60 designation has been used for a number of projects at Myasishchev, including a recent transport and civil aircraft.

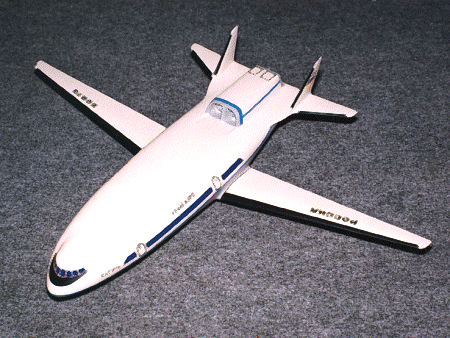
Model of the Aircraft

== Specifications (M-60) ==
- Role: Strategic Bomber / Flying Atomic Laboratory
- Crew: 2 (housed in a massive 60-ton lead-shielded capsule for radiation protection)
- Propulsion: 4 x Lulka nuclear-powered turbojets
- Alternative setup: 2 nuclear engines for cruise and 2 conventional chemical turbojets for takeoff/landing

Performance (Estimated):

- Max Speed: Mach 2 (approx. 2,000+ km/h)
- Range: 25,000 km
- Service Ceiling: 16,500 – 20,000 m

Dimensions:

- Length: ≈59.5 m (195 ft)
- Wingspan: ≈24 m (78 ft)
- Take-off Weight: ≈136,000 kg (300,000 lbs)

== See also ==
Aircraft of comparable role, configuration, and era

- Convair X-6
- Convair NB-36H
- Tupolev Tu-119
