= List of nuclear-powered aircraft =

Below is a list of nuclear powered aircraft and concepts:

Name or designation	Manufacturer	Role	Nationality	Period	Notability
9M730 Burevestnik		Cruise Missile	Russia	2018	
Bell D-1007	Bell Textron	Helicopter	United States	1950s	
Convair Model 23	Convair	Bomber	United States	1950s	
Convair NB-36H	Convair	Bomber	United States	1950s	
Convair NX-2 CAMAL	Convair	Bomber	United States	1950s	
Convair X-6	Convair	Bomber	United States	1950s	
Douglas Model 26	Douglas Aircraft Corporation	Bomber	United States	1950s	
Hughes Interceptor	Hughes Aircraft Corporation	Interceptor	United States	1950s	
Lockheed CL-195	Lockheed Corporation		United States	1950s	
Lockheed CL-1201	Lockheed Corporation	Transport	United States	1960s	
Lockheed L-248-3	Lockheed Corporation		United States	1950s	
Myasishchev M-30	Myasishchev		Soviet Union	1950s	
Myasishchev M-60	Myasishchev		Soviet Union	1950s	
Northrop N-34	Northrop Corporation		United States	1950s	
Northrop N-108	Northrop Corporation		United States	1950s	
Supersonic Low Altitude Missile			United States	1964	
Tupolev Tu-95LAL	Tupolev		Soviet Union	1950s	
Tupolev Tu-119	Tupolev		Soviet Union	1950s	
WS-125	Convair		United States	1950s	

== Bibliography ==
- Buttler, Tony; Gordon, Yefim (2004). "Chapter 6: Nuclear Power and Flying Wings". Soviet secret projects : Bombers since 1945. Hinckley: Midland Publishing. ISBN 1-85780-194-6. Archived from the original on 17 February 2012.
