= Convair Model 23 =

1950s American nuclear aircraft concept

The Convair Model 23 was a 1950s design for an American nuclear-powered seaplane for the United States Navy. Like the Air Force's WS-125, the Model 23 never left the drawing board due to risks posed by operations of nuclear-powered aircraft.

== Development ==
The USAAF/USAF began investigating nuclear power for warplanes in 1946 with NEPA and the ANP. However, the Navy entered the nuclear-powered aircraft field in May 1953, awarding contracts to Convair-San Diego and Martin to explore the feasibility of a nuclear-propelled seaplane. By early 1955, operational requirements and engineering contracts for a nuclear-powered seaplane had been awarded to the manufacturers. Early designs for the Model 23 featured a large seaplane with a length of 171 feet and a wingspan of 131.5 feet, utilizing J75 turbojets fed by a Pratt & Whitney nuclear reactor. Later designs, the Model 23A and 23B, had the turbojets mounted at the back of the wing and fuselage, with the Model 23B's engines situated over the rear of the wing and aft fuselage, and the Model 23A using a delta wing.

Despite the Navy awarding Pratt and Whitney a contract to investigate nuclear systems, especially the indirect cycle engine, the Navy gave up on nuclear-powered aircraft in December 1959.

== See also ==
- List of nuclear-powered aircraft
