= Project Halitosis =

1965 United States Air Force project regarding radioactive gasses

Project Halitosis was a 1960 undertaking by the United States Air Force to study the amount of radioactive gases released from their experimental nuclear-powered bomber program in partnership with Convair. The heavily modified NB-36H bomber contained a small, open-circuit nuclear reactor to test the physical and radiological stresses it placed on the airframe and was not used for power. The radioactive gases released from the air-cooled reactor gave the program its "bad breath" reference. The project was part of the U.S. Air Force's Aircraft Nuclear Propulsion project which operated between 1950 and 1967.
