= Nuclear-powered aircraft =

Flying machine that relies on thrust generated from nuclear energy

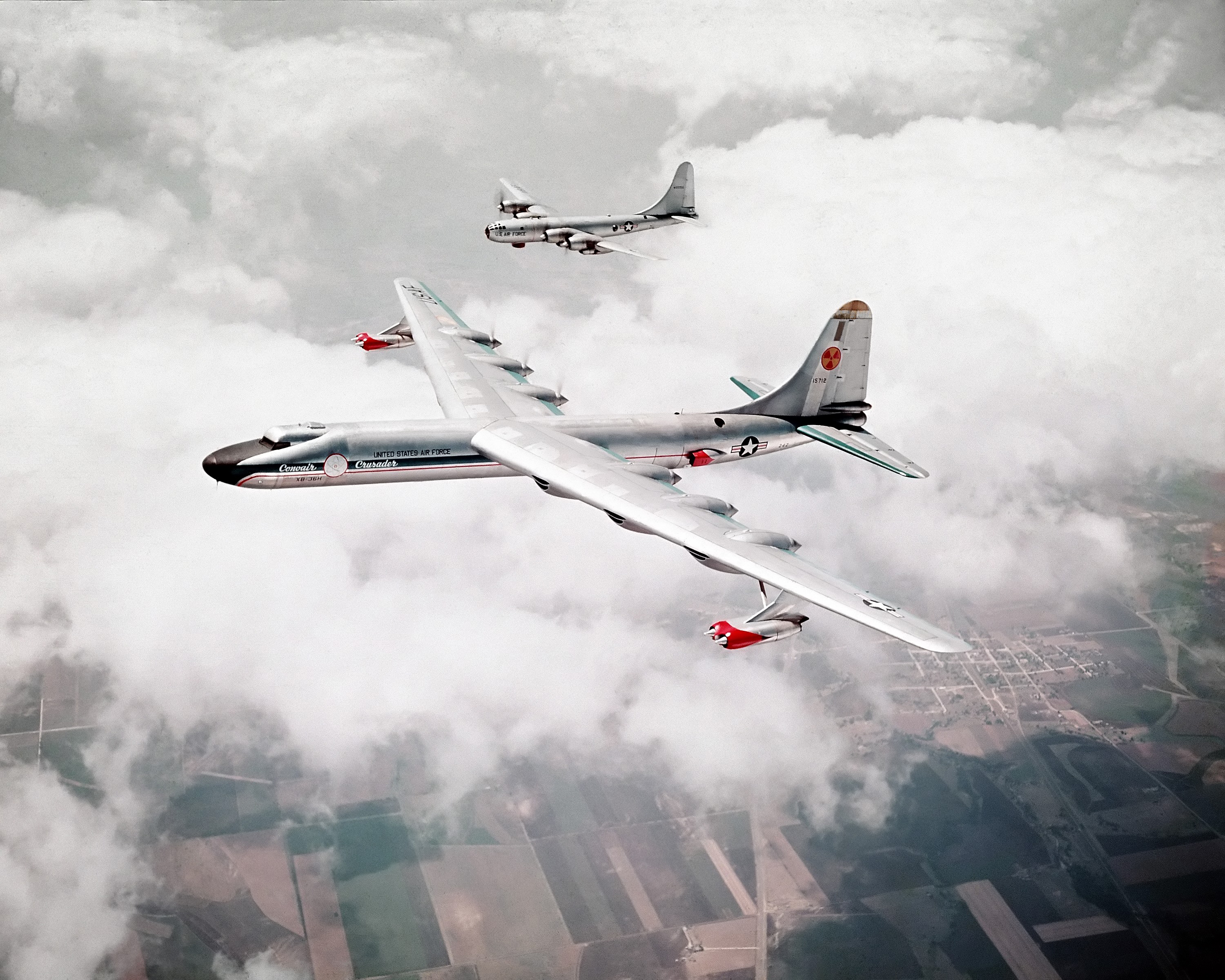
The only US aircraft to carry a nuclear reactor was the NB-36H. The reactor was never connected to the engines. The program was canceled in 1958.

A nuclear-powered aircraft is an aircraft whose power source is nuclear fission. Most designs use a nuclear reactor that heats compressed air inside a jet engine to provide thrust. Either a turbojet or a ramjet can be used, as with ordinary chemical propulsion. During the Cold War, the United States and Soviet Union researched nuclear-powered bomber aircraft, the greater endurance of which could enhance nuclear deterrence, but neither country created any such operational aircraft. The advent of ICBMs and nuclear submarines in the 1960s greatly diminished the strategic advantage of such aircraft, and respective projects were canceled. Likewise, proposals for supersonic nuclear-powered cruise missiles such as Project Pluto were never implemented. However, Russia developed a subsonic nuclear-powered cruise missile beginning in the 2010s, the 9M730 Burevestnik, as a strategic deterrent.

Nuclear aircraft have several inadequately solved design problems, such as the need for heavy shielding to protect the crew and those on the ground from radiation, the release of fission products and neutron activation of nearby air, and crash-worthiness, particularly over water where moderation of neutrons can lead to a damaged reactor suffering a criticality accident.

== U.S. programs ==
=== NEPA and ANP ===
In May 1946, the United States Army Air Forces started the Nuclear Energy for the Propulsion of Aircraft (NEPA) project, which conducted studies until the Aircraft Nuclear Propulsion (ANP) program replaced NEPA in 1951. The ANP program included provisions for studying two different types of nuclear-powered jet engines: General Electric's Direct Air Cycle and Pratt & Whitney's Indirect Air Cycle. ANP planned for Convair to modify two B-36s under the MX-1589 project. One of the B-36s, the NB-36H, was to be used for studying shielding requirements for an airborne reactor, while the other was to be the X-6; however, the program was canceled before the X-6 was completed.

The first operation of a nuclear aircraft engine occurred on January 31, 1956 using a modified General Electric J47 turbojet engine. The Aircraft Nuclear Propulsion program was terminated by President Kennedy after his annual budget message to Congress in 1961.

The Oak Ridge National Laboratory researched and developed nuclear aircraft engines. Two shielded reactors powered two General Electric J87 turbojet engines to nearly full thrust. Two experimental reactors, HTRE-2 with its turbojet engines intact, and HTRE-3 with its engines removed, are at the EBR-1 facility south of the Idaho National Laboratory.

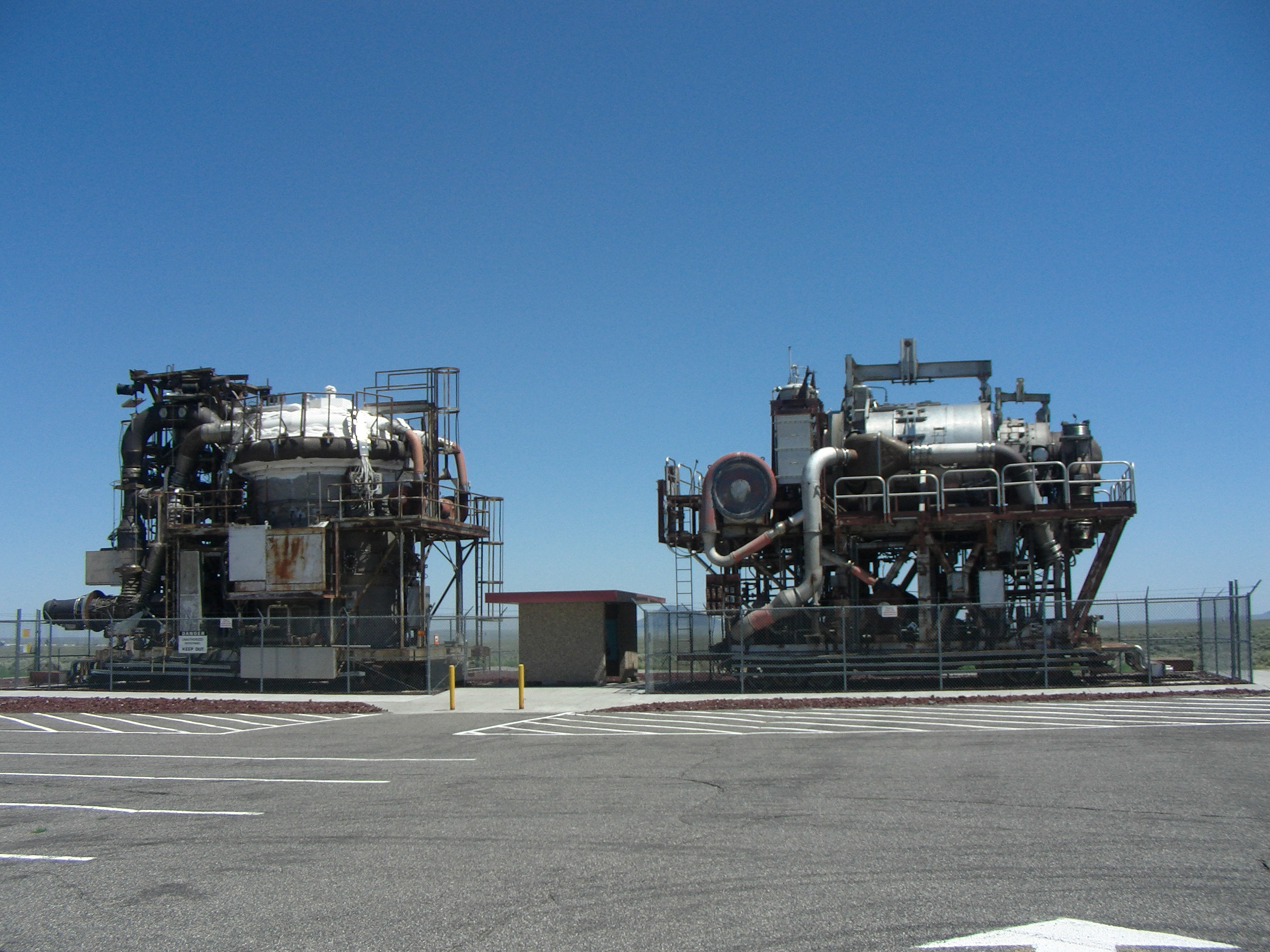
Experimental HTRE reactors for nuclear aircraft, (HTRE-2 left and HTRE-3 right) on display at the Experimental Breeder Reactor I facility (43°30′42.22″N 113°0′18″W).

The U.S. designed these engines for use in a new, specially designed nuclear bomber, the WS-125. Although President Eisenhower eventually terminated it by cutting NEPA and telling Congress that the program was not urgent, he backed a small program for developing high-temperature materials and high-performance reactors; that program was terminated early in the Kennedy administration.

=== Project Pluto ===
In 1957, the Air Force and the U.S. Atomic Energy Commission contracted with the Lawrence Radiation Laboratory to study the feasibility of applying heat from nuclear reactors to ramjet engines. This research became known as Project Pluto. This program was to provide engines for an unmanned cruise missile, called SLAM, for Supersonic Low Altitude Missile. The program succeeded in producing two test engines, which were operated on the ground. On May 14, 1961, the world's first nuclear ramjet engine, "Tory-IIA," mounted on a railroad car, roared to life for just a few seconds. On July 1, 1964, seven years and six months after it was born, "Project Pluto" was canceled.

=== Airships ===
There were several studies and proposals for nuclear-powered airships, starting with a 1954 study by F. W. Locke Jr. for US Navy. In 1957 Edwin J. Kirschner published the book The Zeppelin in the Atomic Age, which promoted the use of atomic airships. In 1959 Goodyear presented a plan for nuclear-powered airship for both military and commercial use. Several other proposals and papers were published during the next decades.

== Soviet programs ==
=== Soviet nuclear bomber scare ===
The 1 December 1958 issue of Aviation Week included an article, "Soviets Flight Testing Nuclear Bomber", that claimed that the Soviets had greatly progressed a nuclear aircraft program: "[a] nuclear-powered bomber is being flight tested in the Soviet Union. Completed about six months ago, this aircraft has been flying in the Moscow area for at least two months. It has been observed both in flight and on the ground by a wide variety of foreign observers from Communist and non-Communist countries." Unlike the US designs of the same era, which were purely experimental, the article noted that "The Soviet aircraft is a prototype of a design to perform a military mission as a continuous airborne alert warning system and missile launching platform." Photographs illustrated the article, along with technical diagrams on the proposed layout; these were so widely seen that one company produced a plastic model aircraft based on the diagrams in the article. An editorial on the topic accompanied the article.

Concerns were soon expressed in Washington that "the Russians were from three to five years ahead of the US in the field of atomic aircraft engines and that they would move even further ahead unless the US pressed forward with its own program". These concerns caused continued but temporary funding of the US's own program.

The aircraft in the photographs was later revealed to be the conventional Myasishchev M-50 Bounder, a medium-range strategic bomber that performed like the United States Air Force-operated B-58 Hustler. The design was considered a failure, never entered service, and was revealed to the public on Soviet Aviation Day in 1963 at Monino, putting the issue to rest.

=== Tupolev Tu-119 ===
The Soviet program of nuclear aircraft development resulted in the experimental Tupolev Tu-95LAL (Russian: LAL- Летающая Атомная Лаборатория, lit. 'Flying Nuclear Laboratory') which derived from the Tupolev Tu-95 bomber, but with a reactor fitted in the bomb bay. The aircraft is reported to have been flown up to 40 times from 1961 to 1969. The main purpose of the flight phase was examining the effectiveness of the radiation shielding. A follow-up design, the Tu-119, was planned to have two conventional turboprop engines and two direct-cycle nuclear jet engines, but was never completed. Several other projects, like the supersonic Tupolev Tu-120, reached only the design phase.

== Russian programs ==
In February 2018, Russian President Vladimir Putin said that Russia had developed a new, nuclear-powered cruise missile that can evade air and missile defenses and hit any point on the globe, later named the 9M730 Burevestnik (Russian: Буревестник; "Storm petrel"). According to the statements, its first flight test occurred in 2017. The missile was said to feature "a small-size super-powerful power plant that can be placed inside the hull of a cruise missile and guarantee a range of flight ten times greater than that of other missiles." The video showed the missile evading defense systems over the Atlantic, flying over Cape Horn and finally north towards Hawaii. To date there is no publicly available evidence to verify these statements. The Pentagon stated that it is aware of a Russian test of a nuclear-powered cruise missile but the system is still under development and had crashed in the Arctic in 2017.

A RAND Corporation researcher specializing in Russia said "My guess is they're not bluffing, that they've flight-tested this thing. But that's incredible." According to a CSIS fellow, such a nuclear-powered missile "has an almost unlimited range – you could have it flying around for long periods of time before you order it to hit something". Putin's statements and the video showing a concept of the missile in flight suggest that it is not a supersonic ramjet like Project Pluto but a subsonic vehicle with a direct-cycle nuclear turbojet engine. Such a missile design is considered extremely dangerous by experts like Jeffrey Lewis, as fission products and other radionuclides from the reactor core, including ^{41}Ar and ^{85m}Kr, are vented directly into the atmosphere. The 2019 Nyonoksa radiation accident likely involving the missile killed 5 military personnel and released radioactive material into the White Sea.

== See also ==
- Aircraft Nuclear Propulsion
- Aircraft Reactor Experiment
- Georgia Nuclear Aircraft Laboratory
- Induced gamma emission speculated as power source for aircraft
- List of nuclear-powered aircraft
- Lockheed Martin Compact Fusion Reactor
- Nuclear thermal rocket

== General and cited sources ==
- Colon, Raul (March 7, 2009). "Soviet Experimentation with Nuclear Powered Bombers". The Aviation History On-Line Museum. Archived from the original on 6 January 2012.
- Buttler, Tony; Gordon, Yefim (2004). "6: Nuclear Power and Flying Wings". Soviet secret projects: Bombers since 1945. Hinckley: Midland Pub. ISBN 1-85780-194-6. Archived from the original on 17 February 2012.
