= General Electric J73 =

1950s American turbojet engine

J73
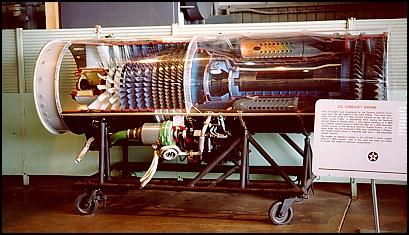
- Cutaway of a J73 at the NMUSAF
- Type: Turbojet
- National origin: United States
- Manufacturer: General Electric
- Major applications: North American F-86H Sabre
- Number built: 870
- Developed from: General Electric J47
- Developed into: General Electric J79

The General Electric J73 turbojet was developed by General Electric from the earlier J47 engine. Its original USAF designation was J47-21, but with innovative features including variable inlet guide vanes, double-shell (inner and outer) combustor case, and 50% greater airflow was redesignated J73. Its only operational use was in the North American F-86H.

== Design and development ==
An engine, uprated from the J47, was required for the F-86H. The mass flow was increased by relocating accessories from the centre of the compressor inlet to the underside of the engine. This allowed a reduction in blade hub diameter, which together with an increase in tip diameter, gave a bigger area for air to enter the compressor. The area through the combustion chambers also had to be increased. This was done by replacing the multiple individual chambers with a single annular casing with individual flame tubes or cans, an arrangement known as cannular.

The pressure ratio was increased and variable inlet guide vanes fitted to prevent low-RPM problems (rotating stall/blade flutter) with the higher design pressure ratio. A 2-stage turbine was required.

A low boost (10% at take-off) afterburner was fitted. It was known as a tailpipe augmentation (TPA) system.

== Nuclear powered ==
Four J73 engines were converted to produce thrust using nuclear energy instead of jet fuel. Testing was done in 1957 at the Atomic Energy Commission's National Reactor testing station. The engines were modified to pass the compressor air through a heat exchanger, in which heat was transferred from a nuclear reactor, before entering the compressor turbine at 1,400 degrees F.

== Variants ==
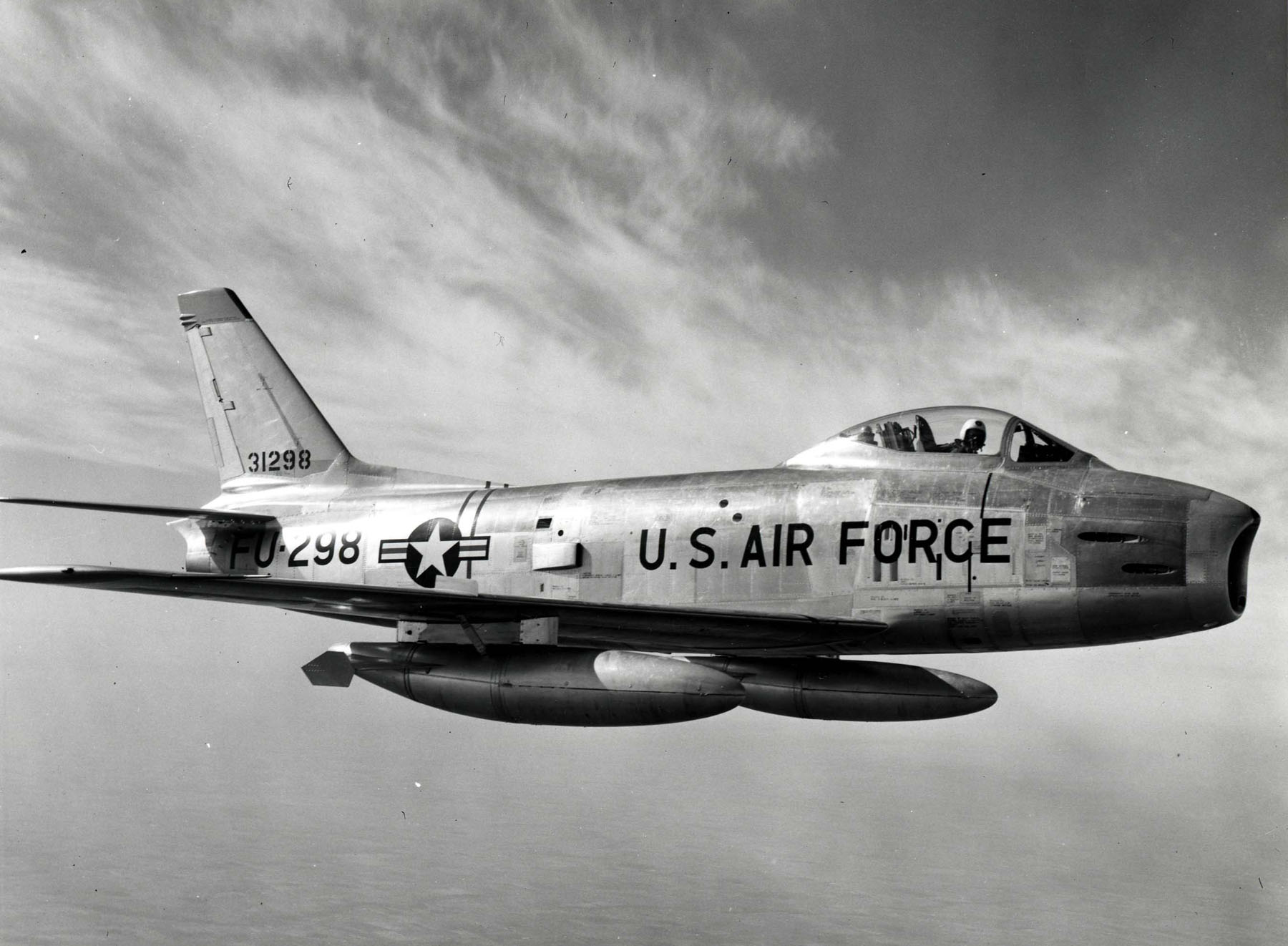
F-86H Sabre

Thrust given in foot-pounds (lbf) and kilonewtons (kN).

J73-GE-1
J73-GE-3
9,200 lbf (40.92 kN) for the North American F-86H Sabre.
J73-GE-5
Variant intended for a proposed Advanced F-89.

== Applications ==
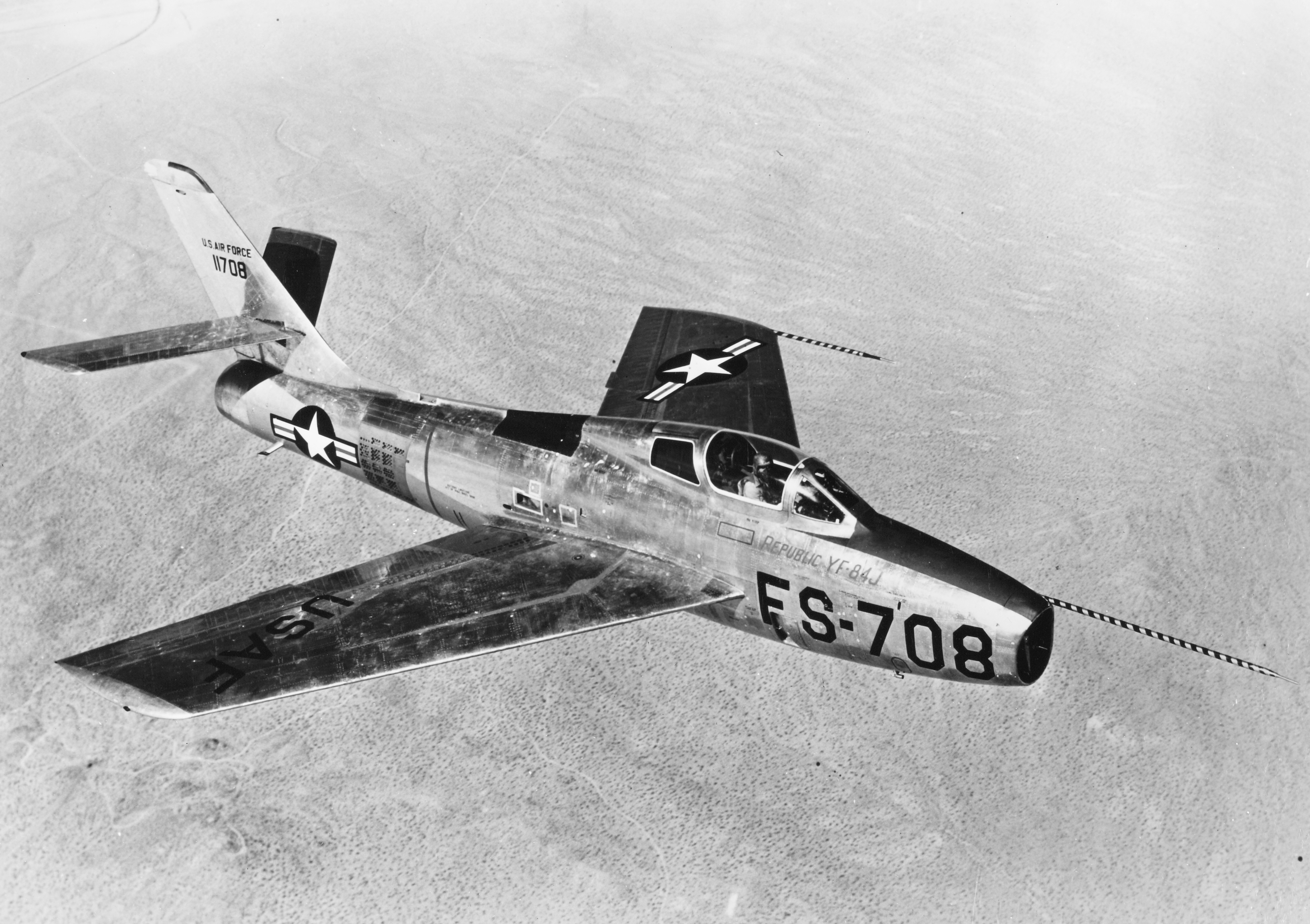
YF-84J Thunderstreak

- North American F-86H Sabre
- Republic YF-84J Thunderstreak, two prototypes

== Specifications (J73-GE-3) ==
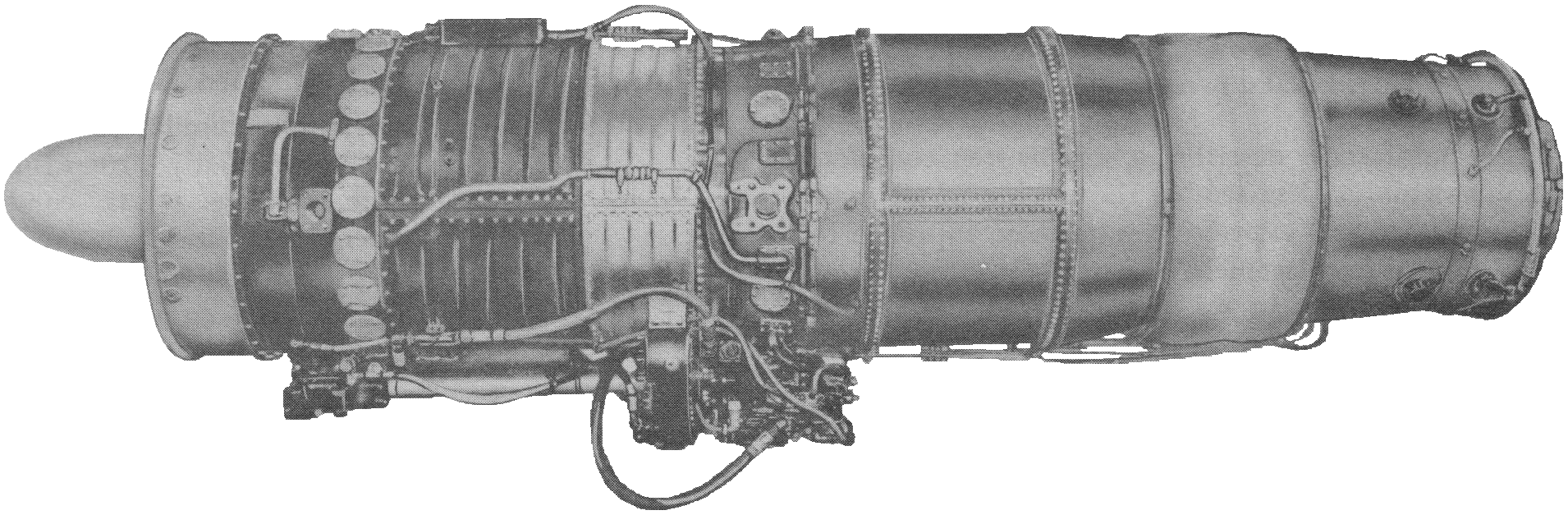
J73-GE-3E profile view

Data from Flight 9 April 1954 : Aero Engines 1954, Aircraft engines of the World 1953

==== General characteristics ====
- Type: non-afterburning turbojet

J73-GE-5 with afterburning

- Length: 200 in (5,080 mm)
- Diameter: 39.5 in (1,003 mm)
- Dry weight: 3,600 lb (1,630 kg)

==== Components ====
- Compressor: 12 stage, axial flow, variable inlet guide vanes
- Combustors: 10 cannular combustion chambers
- Turbine: 2 stage axial turbine
- Fuel type: MIL-F-5624A / JP-4
- Oil system: dry sump, pressure spray with gear pumps

==== Performance ====
- Maximum thrust: 9,000 lbf (40 kN)

J73-GE-5 - 9,500 lbf (42 kN) dry, 12,500 lbf (56 kN) with afterburner

- Overall pressure ratio: 7.5:1
- Air mass flow: 155 lb/s (70 kg/s)
- Specific fuel consumption: 0.9 lb/(lbf⋅h) or 25 g/(kN⋅s)
- Thrust-to-weight ratio: 2.5

J73-GE-5 - 2.64 dry, 3.47 with afterburner

== See also ==
- United States military aircraft engine designations

Related development

- General Electric J47
- General Electric J79
- General Electric YJ93

Comparable engines

- Armstrong Siddeley Sapphire
- Rolls-Royce Avon
- Snecma Atar
- Tumansky R-13
- Tumansky R-25

Related lists

- List of aircraft engines
