= WS-125 =

US proposed nuclear powered strategic bomber

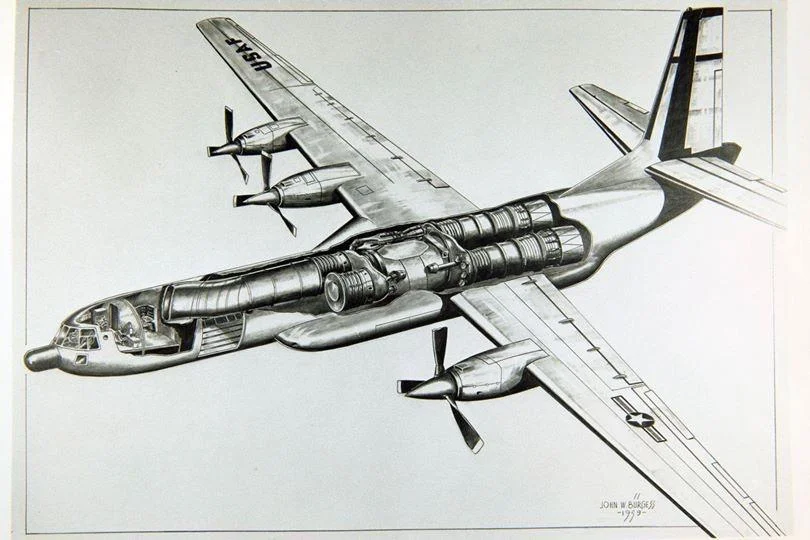
- A cutaway drawing of the proposed WS-125 testbed aircraft

General information
- Project for: Long-range Nuclear-powered aircraft strategic bomber
- Issued by: United States Air Force
- Requirement: WS-125

The WS-125 was an American super-long-range strategic bomber project during the Cold War to develop a nuclear-powered aircraft.

== Development ==
In 1954, the United States Air Force (USAF) issued a weapons system requirement for a nuclear-powered bomber, designated WS-125. In 1956, General Electric teamed up with Convair (X211 program) and Pratt & Whitney with Lockheed in competitive engine/airframe development to address the requirement.

In 1956, the USAF decided that the proposed WS-125 bomber was unfeasible as an operational strategic aircraft. Finally, after spending more than $1 billion, the project was cancelled on March 28, 1961.

== Powerplants ==
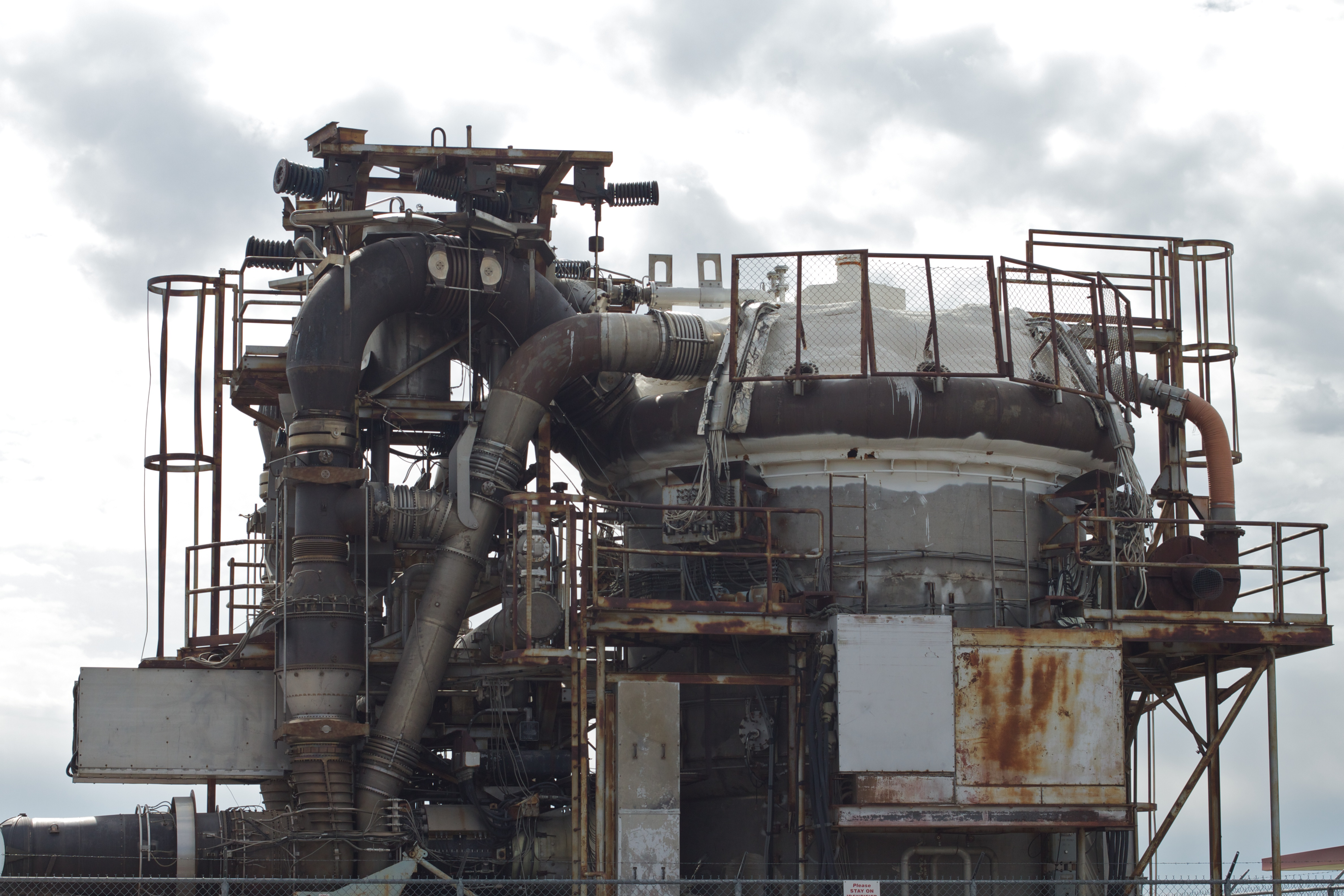
HTRE-2, a nuclear aircraft engine prototype at the Idaho National Laboratory

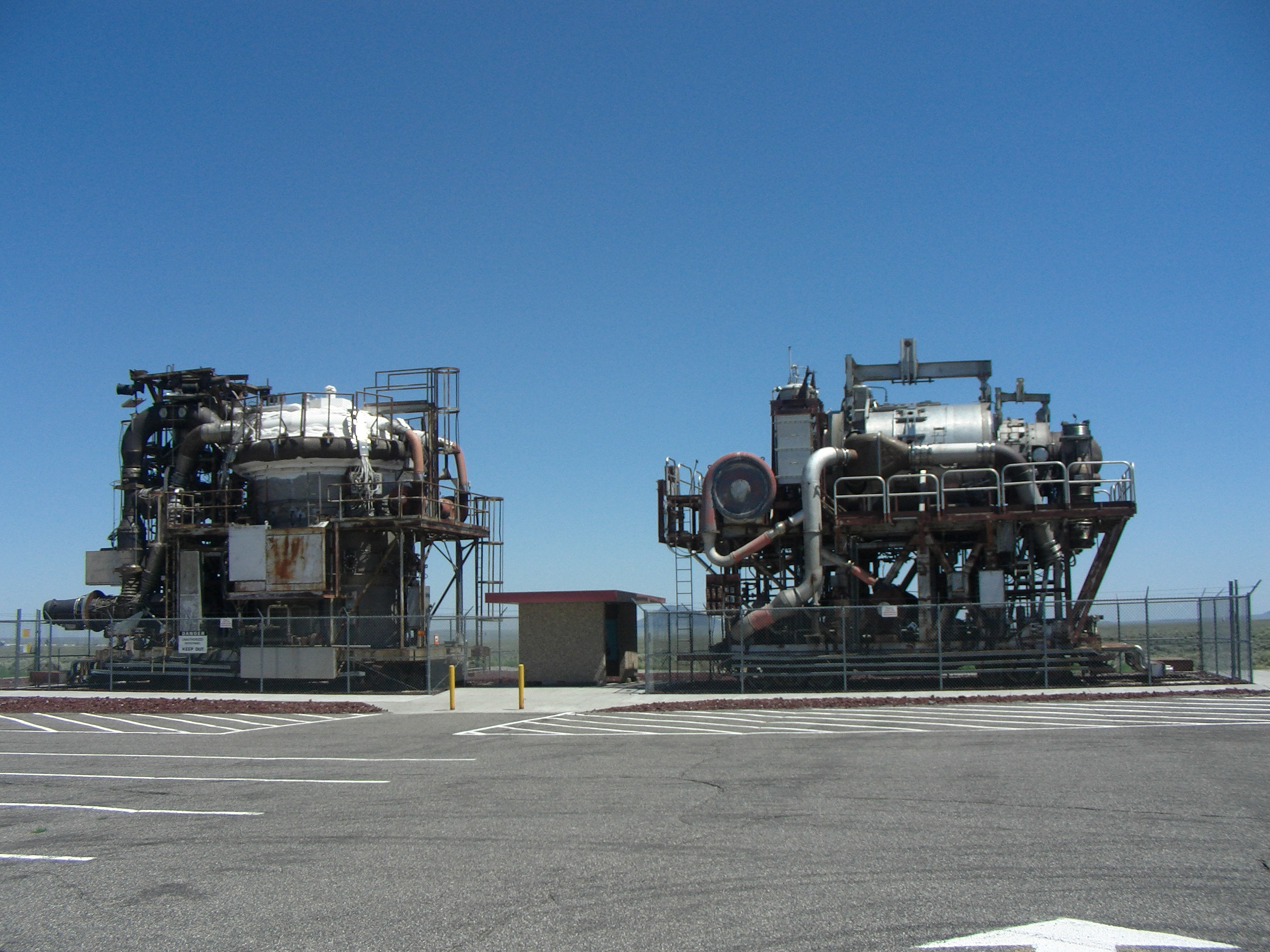
Experimental HTRE reactors for nuclear aircraft (HTRE-2 left and HTRE-3 right), on display at Idaho National Laboratory near Arco, Idaho

Two General Electric J87 turbojet engines were successfully powered to nearly full thrust using two shielded reactors. Two experimental engines complete with reactor systems (HTRE-3 and HTRE-1, which was modified and renamed HTRE-2) are located at the EBR-1 facility south of the Idaho National Laboratory.

== See also ==
- List of nuclear-powered aircraft
- Aircraft Nuclear Propulsion – U.S. project 1946–1961
- 9M730 Burevestnik (Russia)
- Project Pluto – US nuclear ramjet project, 1957–1964
- Convair NB-36H – American experimental plane (1955–61)
- Convair X-6 – US proposed nuclear-powered plane (1950s)
