= Arco Baptist Community Church =

Church building in Arco, Idaho, U.S.

- U.S. National Register of Historic Places
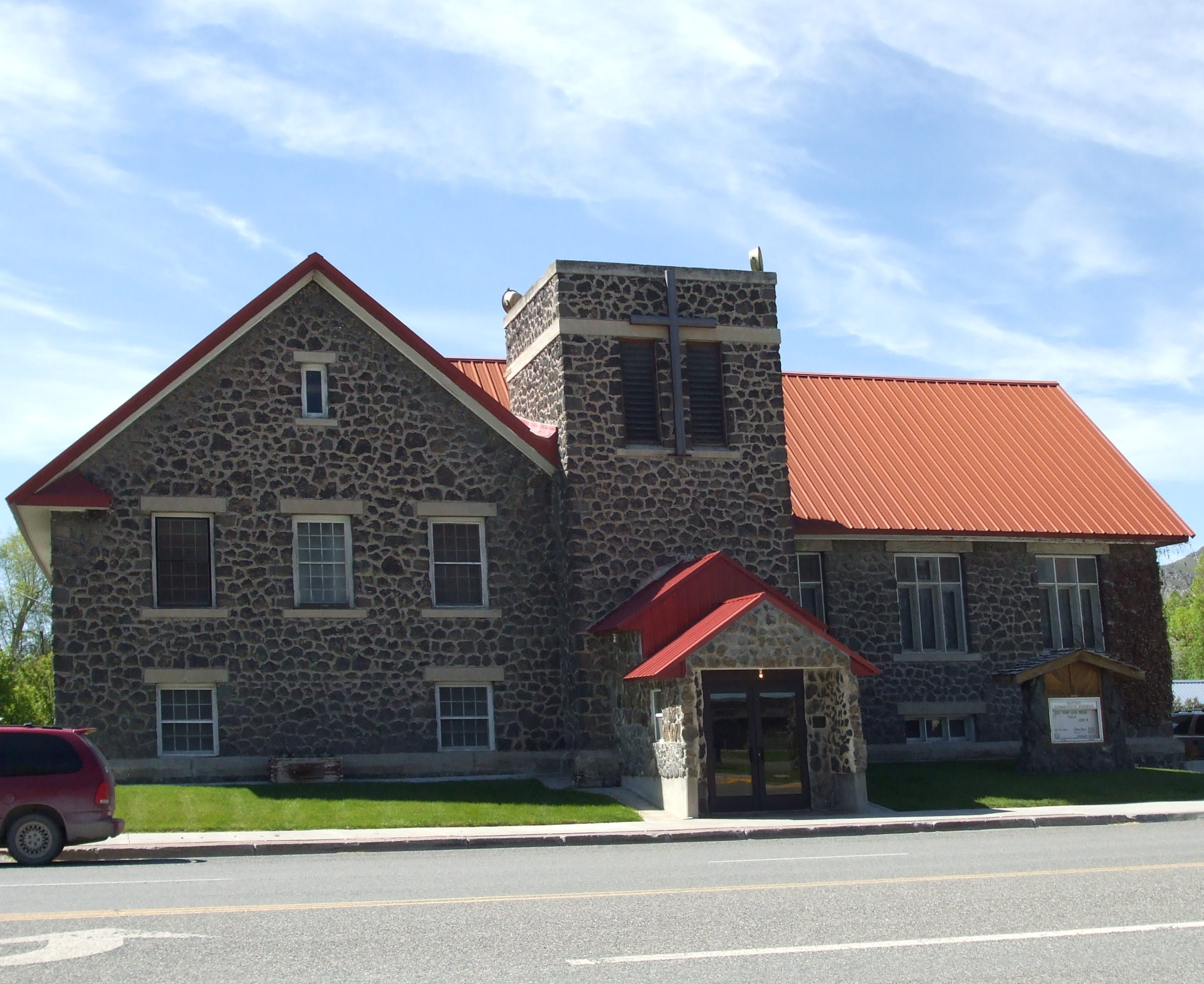

- Location within Idaho Location within the United States
- Location: 402 W. Grand Ave., Arco, Idaho
- Coordinates: 43°38′2″N 113°18′14″W
- Area: less than one acre
- Built: 1929
- Architectural style: Romanesque Revival
- NRHP reference No.: 01001303
- Added to NRHP: November 29, 2001

The Arco Baptist Community Church is a church building located in Arco, Idaho listed on the National Register of Historic Places. Also known as Arco Baptist Church, it was completed in 1929 and was listed on the National Register in 2001.

It is a two-story building which was built to plans provided by the American Baptist Home Mission Society. It is 88 by 70 feet (27 m × 21 m) in plan. Its Romanesque Revival style is disguised by use of rounded local fieldstone instead of square-cut ashlar stone.

== See also ==
- List of National Historic Landmarks in Idaho
- National Register of Historic Places listings in Butte County, Idaho
