= General Electric J87 =

Nuclear-powered turbojet engine

J87
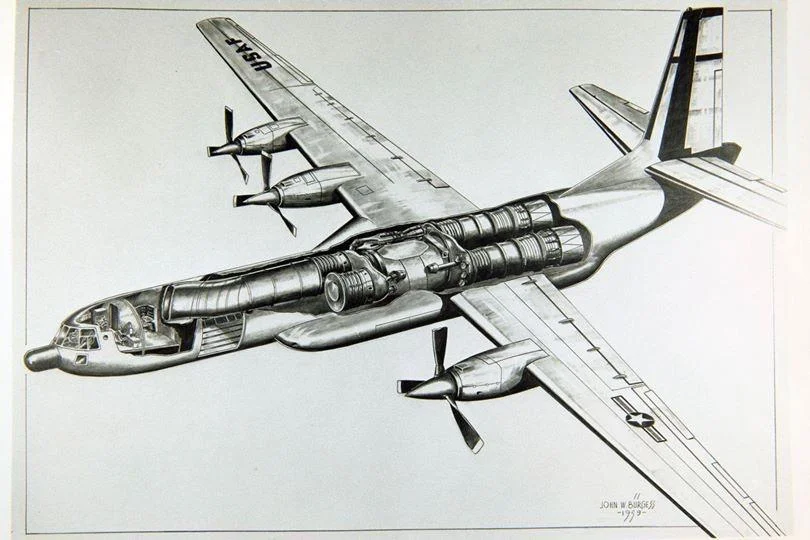
- Cutaway drawing of the WS-125 testbed aircraft, showing its two J87 engines.
- Type: Nuclear powered afterburning turbojet
- National origin: United States
- Manufacturer: General Electric
- Number built: at least 2

The General Electric J87 was a nuclear-powered turbojet engine designed to power the proposed WS-125 long-range bomber. The program was started in 1955 in conjunction with Convair for a joint engine/airframe proposal for the WS-125. It was one of two nuclear-powered gas turbine projects undertaken by GE, the other one being the X39 project.

== Design and development ==
The J87 was a large turbojet, designed to operate as a paired unit, with a nuclear reactor power section. The complete power-plant was given the project designation X211.

The X211 was a relatively large multiple turbojet engine of conventional layout, save for the combustion chambers being replaced by a nuclear reactor where half of the total air-flow through the turbojet sections was used for direct-cycle cooling of the reactor. The J87 components featured variable-stator compressors and chemically fuelled afterburners and a single nuclear reactor to supply heat to both J87 engines.

Several arrangements for the X211 were studied but eventually the paired J87 was chosen and development was started at General Electrics Evendale factory. The air by-passed around the XMA-1A nuclear reactor passed through can-style combustion chambers arranged around the core, used for starting, burning normal jet fuel to ensure cooling air flow for the reactor as soon as it was started-up. The reactor core sat in the middle of the combustion section, fed with cooling air from a large plenum chamber. Heated exhaust air was collected by another plenum chamber to be fed to the turbine sections. Testing of the X211 was confined to the XJ87 turbojet sections.

In 1956, the United States Air Force (USAF) decided that the proposed WS-125 bomber was infeasible as an operational strategic aircraft. In spite of this, the X211 program was continued for another 3 years, albeit with no target application. It was finally terminated in mid-1959 and by 1961, all funding for nuclear propulsion was removed.

The competing Pratt & Whitney indirect-cycle engines used J91 turbojet sections in the X287 and X291 projects, which were also cancelled with the demise of the nuclear-powered bomber program.

== Specifications (single J87) ==
Data from

==== General characteristics ====
- Type: Afterburning direct-cycle nuclear turbojet
- Length: 41 ft (12 m)
- Diameter: 80 in (2,000 mm) +
- Dry weight: 15,745 lb (7,142 kg) turbojet section sans reactor

==== Components ====
- Compressor: 16-stage variable stator axial compressor
- Combustors: Direct-cycle air-cooled XMA-1A nuclear reactor
- Turbine: 3-stage axial turbine
- Fuel type: Nuclear (JP-4 to start)

==== Performance ====
- Maximum thrust: 27,370 lbf (121.7 kN) 34,600 lbf (154 kN) with afterburner
- Overall pressure ratio: 14:1
- Bypass ratio: 50% by-passed reactor
- Air mass flow: 425 lb/s (193 kg/s)
- Turbine inlet temperature: ca 1,800 °F (980 °C; 1,260 K)
