= National Register of Historic Places listings in Butte County, Idaho =

Location of Butte County in Idaho

This is a list of the National Register of Historic Places listings in Butte County, Idaho.

This is intended to be a complete list of the properties on the National Register of Historic Places in Butte County, Idaho, United States. Latitude and longitude coordinates are provided for many National Register properties and districts; these locations may be seen together in a map.

There are 4 properties listed on the National Register in the county, including 1 National Historic Landmark. More may be added; properties and districts nationwide are added to the Register weekly.

This National Park Service list is complete through NPS recent listings posted May 23, 2025.

== Current listings ==
	Name on the Register	Image	Date listed	Location	City or town	Description
1	Arco Baptist Community Church	Arco Baptist Community Church	November 29, 2001 (#01001303)	402 W. Grand Ave. 43°38′02″N 113°18′14″W	Arco	
2	Craters of the Moon National Monument Mission 66 Historic District	Craters of the Moon National Monument Mission 66 Historic District	March 7, 2022 (#100006698)	18 miles (29 km) west of Arco on US 20/26/93 (Craters of the Moon National Monument); 43°27′42″N 113°33′42″W	Arco vicinity	
3	Experimental Breeder Reactor No. 1	Experimental Breeder Reactor No. 1	October 15, 1966 (#66000307)	Idaho National Laboratory; 43°30′41″N 113°00′20″W	Arco	
4	Goodale's Cutoff	Goodale's Cutoff	May 1, 1974 (#74000735)	South of Arco off U.S. Route 20; 43°28′48″N 113°33′52″W	Arco	

== See also ==
- List of National Historic Landmarks in Idaho
- National Register of Historic Places listings in Idaho
