= Lockheed CL-1201 =

American nuclear-powered aircraft design study

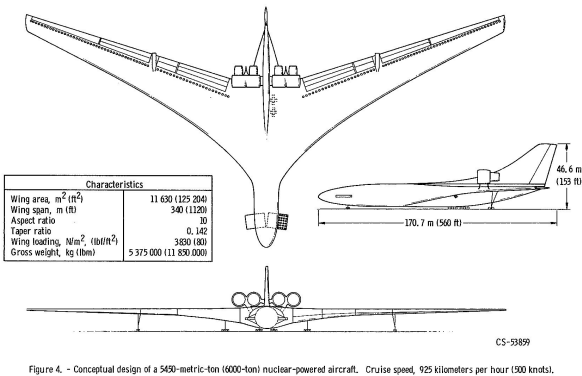
- Schematics for the CL-1201

General information
- Type: Transport
- Designer: Lockheed
- Status: Design study
- Primary user: United States Air Force (projected)
- Number built: None

History
- Developed from: CL-1170

The Lockheed CL-1201 was a design study by Lockheed for a large 6,000-ton nuclear-powered transport aircraft during the late 1960s. One possible use of the concept was as an airborne aircraft carrier.

Although the Department of Defense does not seem to have records of the study's ultimate outcome, the design itself has nonetheless been cited by several sources.

== Design ==
The CL-1201 design project studied a nuclear-powered aircraft of extreme size, with a wingspan of 1,120 feet (340 m). Had it been built, it would have had the largest wingspan of any airplane to date, and more than three times that of any aircraft of the 20th century.

The wing would be of crescent form, similar to the British Handley Page Victor V-bomber but, unlike the British design, it was tailless.

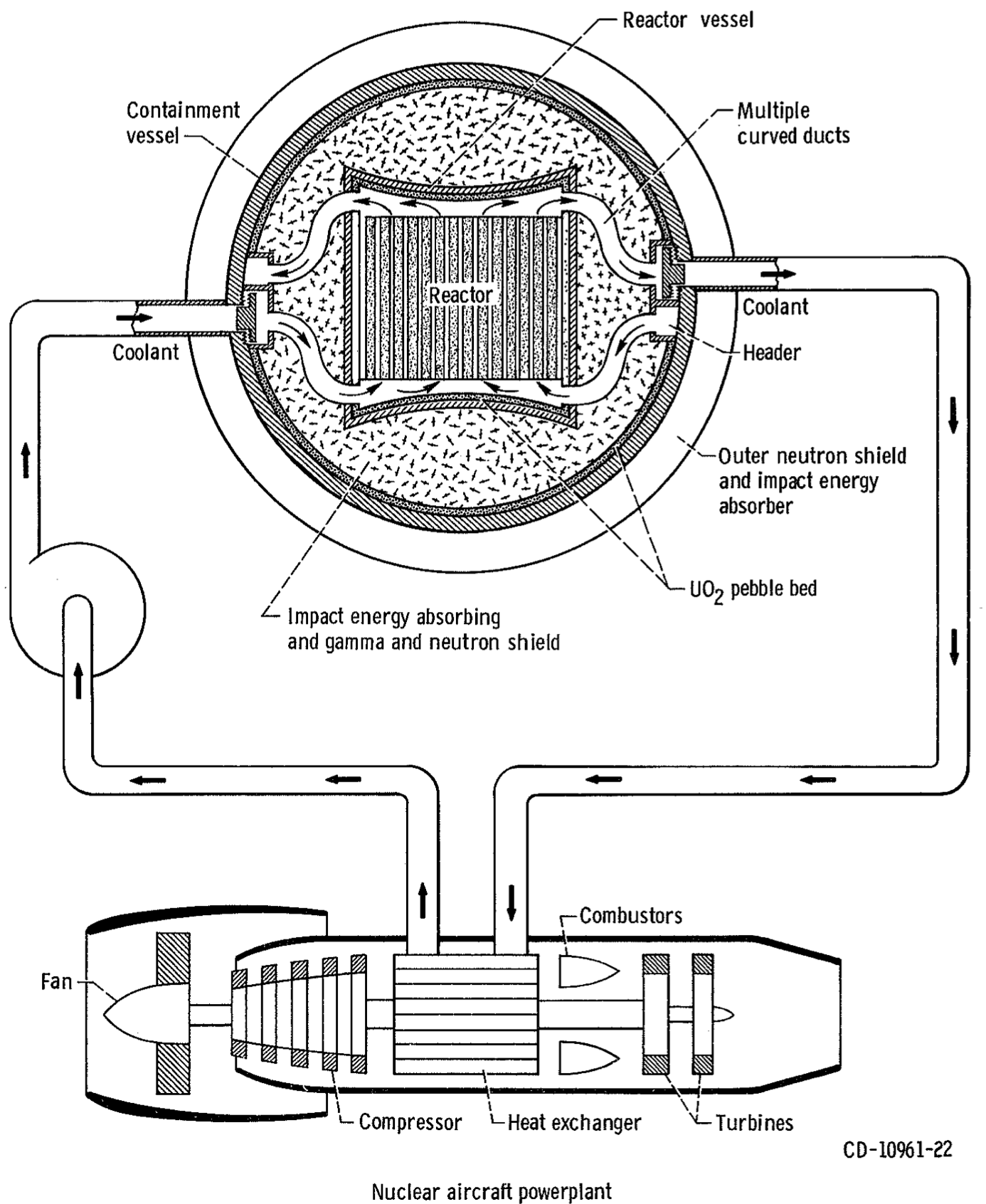
A technical drawing of the nuclear power plant to be used in the CL-1201.

Power would be derived from the heat generated by a nuclear reactor and transferred to four jet engines near the rear, where it would heat the air passing through to provide thrust. The craft would be capable of remaining airborne for extended periods, with an estimated endurance of 41 days. At low altitudes, the jets would burn conventional aviation fuel. In order to take off, the airplane required 182 additional vertical lift engines.

Two variants were studied, a logistics support aircraft and an airborne aircraft carrier. There was a rumored third variant, but information on such a model has never been made public.

The logistics support variant would have a conventional heavy transport role, carrying hundreds of troops and their equipment at once.

The airborne aircraft carrier would have carried as many as 22 fighter aircraft externally and would have had an internal dock capable of handling two air-to-ground shuttle transport aircraft.

== Specifications ==
Data from Large nuclear-powered subsonic aircraft for transoceanic commerce, p.4.

General characteristics

- Crew: 400–845
- Length: 560 ft (170 m)
- Wingspan: 1,120 ft 0 in (340 m)
- Wing area: 125,204 sq ft (11,630 m^{2})
- Aspect ratio: 10
- Gross weight: 11,850,000 lb (5,375,000 kg)
- Powerplant: 4 × main
- Powerplant: 182 × lift-fans

Performance

- Endurance: 41 days
- Reactor output: 1830 megawatts
- Tactical fighters carried (AAC variant): 22

== See also ==
- Short SB.4 Sherpa
- Airborne aircraft carrier
- List of large aircraft
