= Convair NB-36H =

American experimental plane (1955–61)

NB-36H
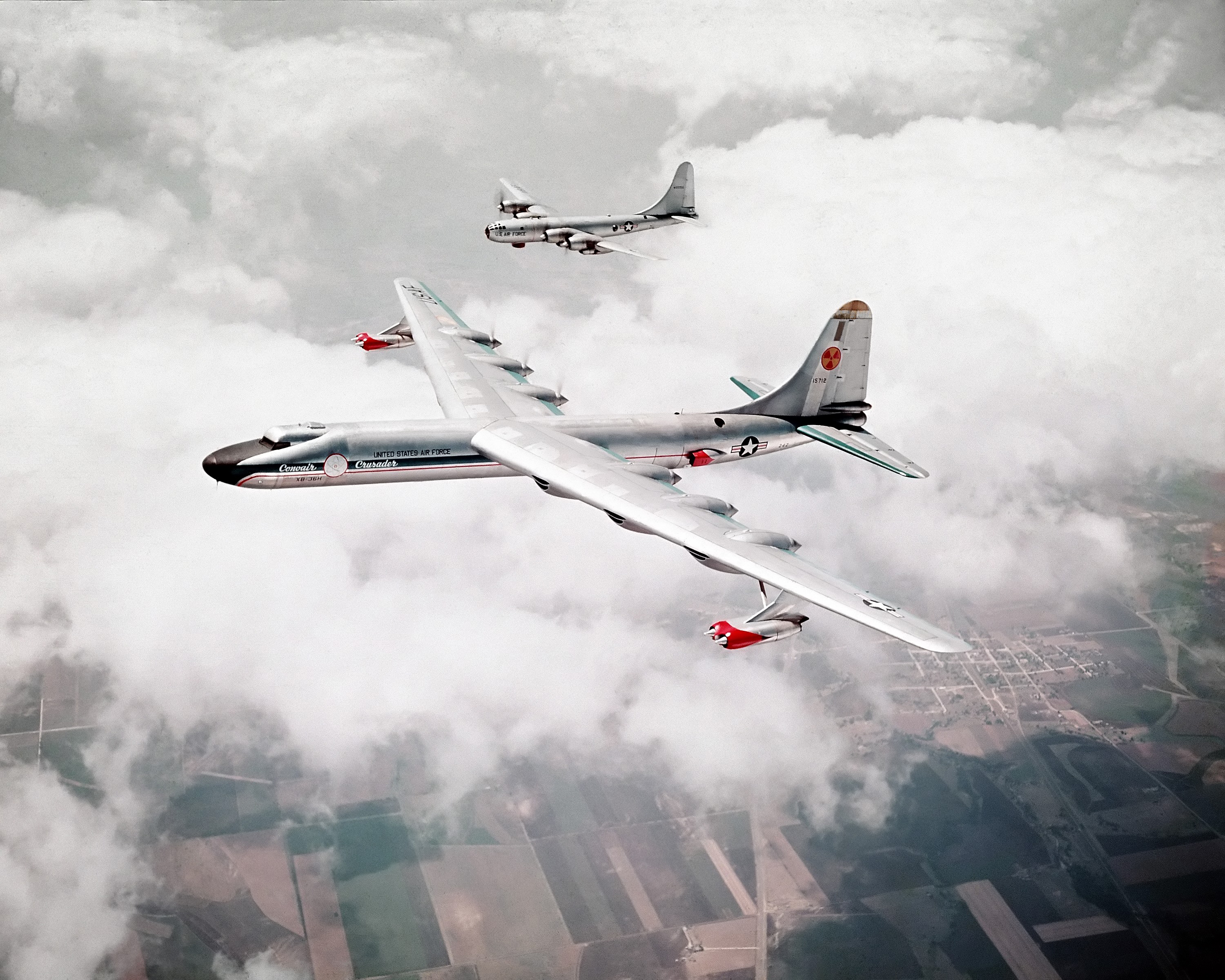
- The Convair NB-36 in flight, with a B-50 Superfortress

General information
- Other name: "The Crusader"
- Type: Experimental aircraft
- Manufacturer: Convair
- Status: Canceled in 1961
- Primary user: United States Air Force
- Number built: 1
- Serial: 51-5712

History
- First flight: September 17, 1955
- Developed from: Convair B-36
- Developed into: Convair X-6

The Convair NB-36H was an experimental aircraft that carried a nuclear reactor to test its protective radiation shielding for the crew, but did not use it to power the aircraft. Nicknamed "the Crusader", it was created for the Aircraft Nuclear Propulsion program, to show the feasibility of a nuclear-powered bomber. Its development ended with the cancellation of the ANP program in March 1961.

== Design and development ==
The Aircraft Nuclear Propulsion (ANP) program, and the preceding Nuclear Energy for the Propulsion of Aircraft (NEPA) project, worked to develop a nuclear propulsion system for aircraft. The United States Army Air Forces initiated Project NEPA on May 28, 1946. After funding of $10 million in 1947, NEPA operated until May 1951, when the project was transferred to the joint Atomic Energy Commission (AEC)/USAF ANP. The USAF pursued two different systems for nuclear-powered jet engines, the Direct Air Cycle concept, which was developed by General Electric, and Indirect Air Cycle, which was assigned to Pratt & Whitney. The program was intended to develop and test the Convair X-6, a planned prototype for a fully functional nuclear-powered airplane.

In 1952, Carswell Air Force Base in Texas was hit by a tornado, severely damaging a number of aircraft. One of the damaged airplanes was a B-36 bomber, and Convair suggested to the Air Force that it should be converted into an early prototype for the X-6, instead of being repaired. The Air Force agreed to this plan and provided funding for an overhaul of the airplane. The intention was to test-fly an airplane with a functioning nuclear engine on board, but with it not yet powering the airplane at this stage.

The original crew and avionics cabin was replaced by a massive lead- and rubber-lined 11-ton crew section for a pilot, copilot, flight engineer, and two nuclear engineers. Even the small windows had 25-to-30-centimeter-thick (10–12 in) lead glass. The aircraft was fitted with a 1-megawatt air-cooled reactor, with a weight of 35,000 pounds (16,000 kg). This was hung on a hook in the middle bomb bay to allow for easy loading and unloading, so that the radioactive source could be kept safely underground between the test flights. A monitoring system dubbed "Project Halitosis" measured radioactive gases from the reactor.

== Operational history ==
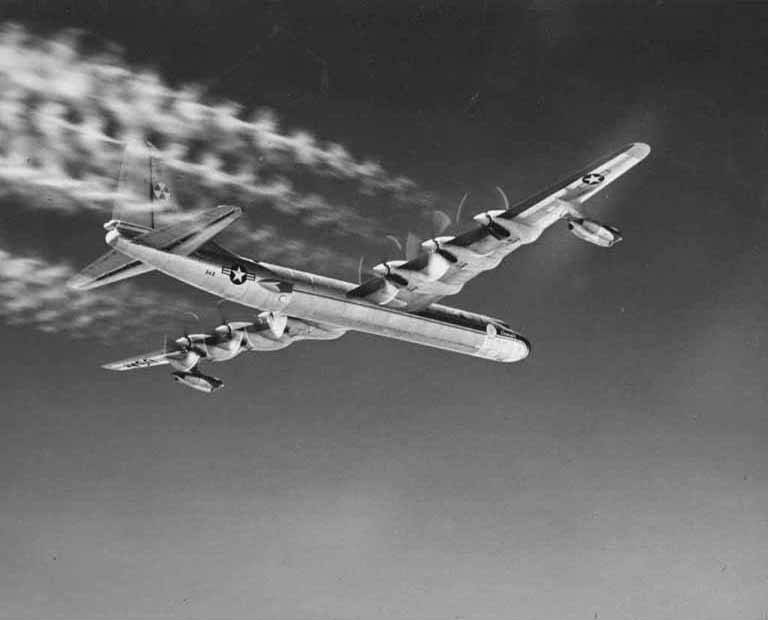
An underside view of the aircraft

The NB-36H completed 47 test flights and 215 hours of flight time (during 89 of which the reactor was operated) between September 17, 1955, and March 1957 over New Mexico and Texas. Test flights showed that the shielding protected the crew from reactor radiation, but that an accident could still cause radioactive contamination.

In 1957, after its flight tests ended, the NB-36H was decommissioned and scrapped at Carswell. The nuclear reactor was removed. As Cold War tensions increased in the late 1950s, the US government pushed to develop a heavy bomber with jet engines.

Parallel nuclear and conventional aircraft programs sought to achieve this goal, but progress on the nuclear plane was slow. President Dwight Eisenhower was not convinced of the need for the program, and he did not assign any urgency to it, although he did maintain funding. By the late 1950s the concept of nuclear-powered planes was increasingly seen by Congress as redundant, given the ongoing advances in supersonic aviation and ballistic missile development.

In March 1961, shortly after he took office, President John F. Kennedy canceled the program. In his statement, Kennedy commented that the prospect of nuclear-powered planes was still very remote, despite 15 years of development and expenditure of around $1 billion. The Convair X-6 was never built, and the NB-36H is to date the only American aircraft to carry an operational nuclear reactor. The scientific work carried out for the project did have some lasting value, however, including methods for handling liquid metals and fused salts, which aided the development of nuclear generators and reactors used by NASA.

== Specifications ==
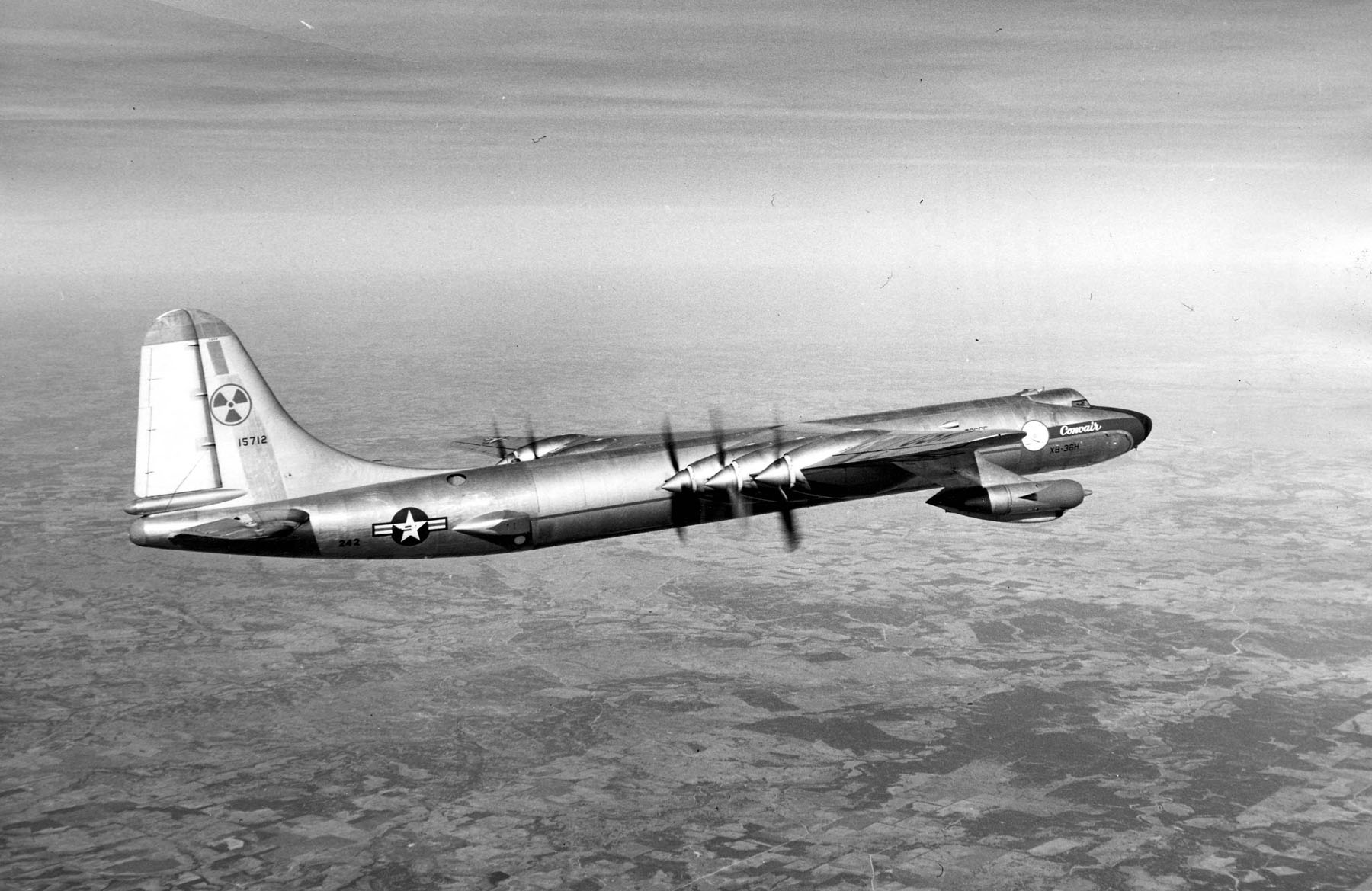
The NB-36H in flight. Note the 2 pods; each was mounted near the wingtips of the aircraft and carried two GE J47 jet engines each.

General characteristics

- Crew: 5
- Length: 49.38 m (162 ft 1 in)
- Wingspan: 70.10 m (230 ft 0 in)
- Height: 14.23 m (46 ft 8 in)
- Wing area: 443.3 m^{2} (4,770 sq ft)
- Gross weight: 162,305 kg (357,500 lb)
- Powerplant: 4 × General Electric J47 turbojets, 23.1 kN (5,200 lbf) thrust each
- Powerplant: 6 × Pratt & Whitney R-4360-53 radials, 2,830 kW (3,800 hp) each

Performance

- Maximum speed: 676 km/h (420 mph, 360 kn)
- Cruise speed: 430 km/h (270 mph, 230 kn)
- Service ceiling: 12,200 m (40,000 ft)

== See also ==
Related development

- Convair B-36 Peacemaker
- Convair X-6

Aircraft of comparable role, configuration, and era

- Tupolev Tu-95LAL
- WS-125

Related lists

- List of nuclear-powered aircraft
