= GE Beetle =

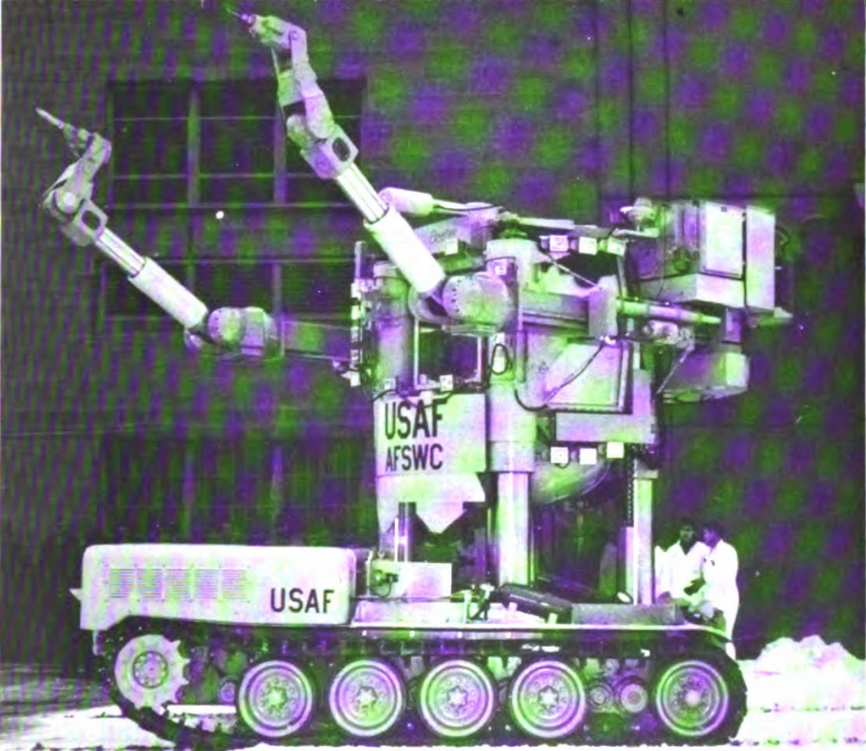
- Type: Mobile manipulator
- Place of origin: United States

Service history
- Used by: United States Air Force: Air Force Nuclear Weapons Center

Production history
- Designer: General Electric
- Manufacturer: Jered Industries
- Unit cost: ~$1.5 million (~1959) (~$13.3 million FY2020)
- No. built: 1

Specifications
- Mass: 85 short tons (77.1 t)
- Length: 19 ft (5.79 m): Arms: 16 ft (4.88 m)
- Width: 12 ft (3.66 m)
- Height: 11 ft (3.35 m)
- Crew: 1

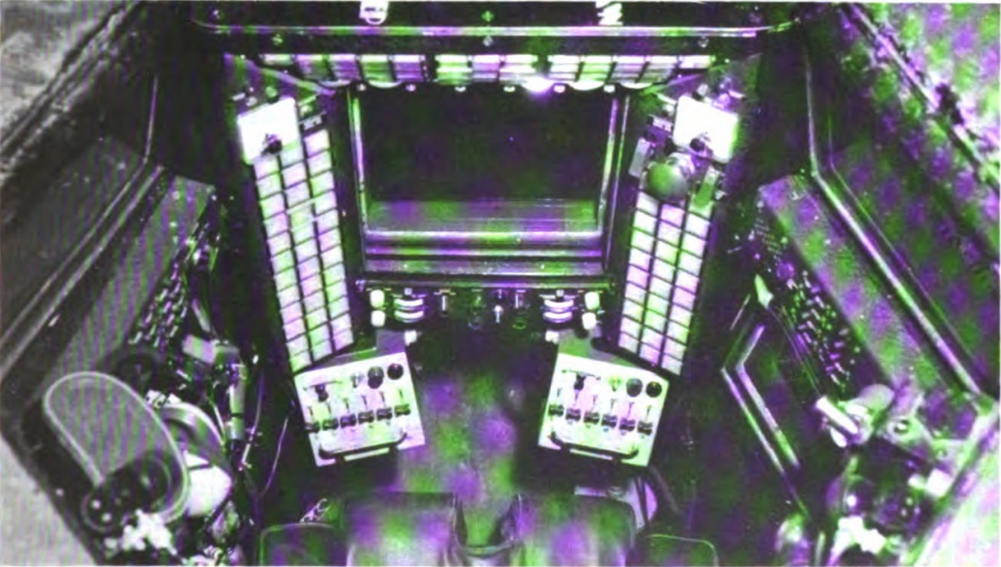
Inside the cab of the Beetle

The Beetle was the nickname of a large mobile manipulator built by Jered Industries in Detroit for General Electric and ordered by the Air Force Special Weapons Center. It was designed to handle nuclear material for nuclear bombers. Work on the Beetle began in 1959 and it was completed in 1961. It was built on a chassis from a M42 Duster. The Beetle was 19 feet long, 12 feet wide, 11 feet high and weighed 77 tons. The top speed was 8 miles per hour.

The Beetle was designed to allow an unlimited number of 8-hour workdays in the expected radiation environment servicing nuclear-powered aircraft

== See also ==
- Mecha
