= General Electric J47 =

Turbojet Engine developed in 1947

J47
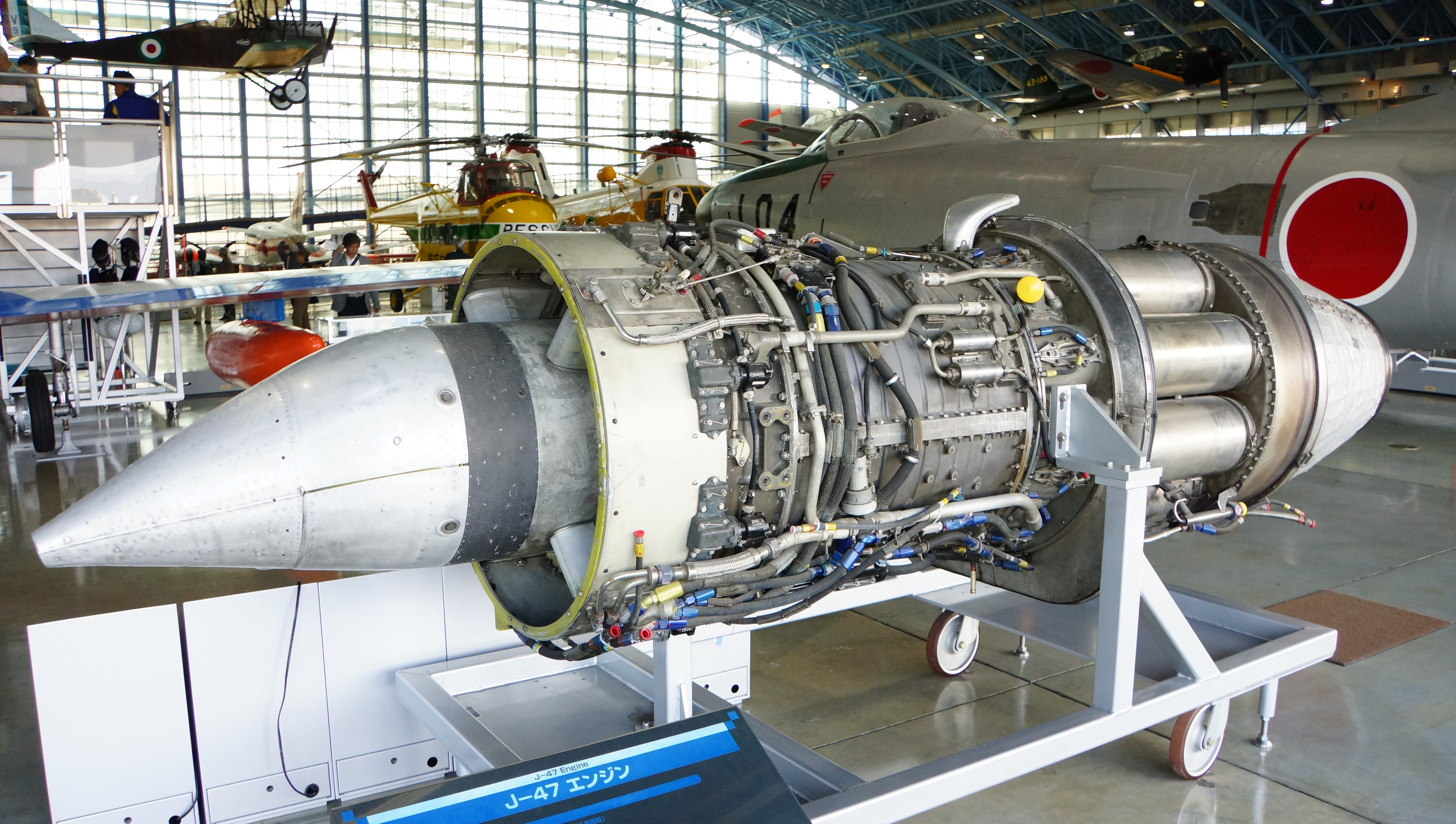
- Preserved General Electric J47
- Type: Turbojet
- Manufacturer: General Electric
- First run: 21 June 1947
- Major applications: Boeing B-47 Stratojet; Convair B-36 Peacemaker; North American B-45 Tornado; North American F-86 Sabre
- Number built: 36,500
- Developed from: General Electric J35
- Developed into: General Electric J73

The General Electric J47 turbojet (GE company designation TG-190) was developed by General Electric from its earlier J35. It first flew in May 1948. The J47 was the first axial-flow turbojet approved for commercial use in the United States. It was used in many types of aircraft, and more than 30,000 were manufactured before production ceased in 1956. It saw continued service in the US military until 1978. Packard built 3,025 of the engines under license.

The J47's greatest advantage, as advertised, was its array of features which were unavailable and unprecedented in any other engine. It was advertised as an 'all-weather engine' due to its anti-icing systems which allowed it to perform at high altitudes and extreme temperatures where other aircraft's performance suffered. Its development began without an explicit need for it, although this design was quickly purchased by the military for its many potential benefits.

In 1978, J47s were formally withdrawn from active military duty when the Air National Guard retired the jet-boosted KC-97Js. Despite this, these engines are still extensively utilized in F-86 Sabre jets owned by civilians, making them a common sight at air shows.

== Design and development ==
The J47 design used experience from the TG-180/J35 engine which was described by Flight magazine in 1948 as the most widely used American-conceived turbojet.

The turbojet featured a revolutionary anti-icing system where hollow frame struts allowed heated airflow to pass through from the compressor, allowing fighter jets equipped with the engine to function at high altitudes, and in cold conditions such as the top of Mount Washington in New Hampshire's White Mountains, where the engine was first tested.

The engine featured an electronically controlled afterburner, a system that dumped additional fuel into the combustor pipe 'behind' the engine, reheating the exhaust and producing significantly more thrust, although with greatly reduced efficiency and high fuel burn rates.

The engine production process in the Lockland facility (renamed to the Evendale facility) utilized vertical engine assembly to ensure compressor rotor balance and stability. The technological jump provided by the engine led to it becoming the most produced jet engine in aviation history, and established GE Aviation as a worldwide leader in jet propulsion.

Overhaul life for the J47 ranged from 15 hours (in 1948) to a theoretical 1,200 hours (625 achievable in practice) in 1956. For example, the J47-GE-23 was rated to run 225 hours time between overhauls. As installed on the F-86F, it experienced one in-flight shutdown every 33,000 hours in 1955 and 1956.

== Variants ==
Thrust given in foot-pounds (lbf) and kilonewtons (kN).

J47-GE-1
(TG-190A) 4,850 pounds-force (22 kN) thrust.
J47-GE-2
(TG-190E) 6,000 pounds-force (27 kN) at 7,950 rpm, powered the North American FJ-2 Fury
J47-GE-3
(TG-190A) 4,850 pounds-force (22 kN), powered the second XB-47
J47-GE-7
(TG-190B) 5,000 pounds-force (22 kN), powered the Republic XF-91 Thunderceptor (first engine)
J47-GE-9
(TG-190B) 5,000 pounds-force (22 kN)
J47-GE-11
(TG-190C) Powered the Boeing B-47A and B-47B, Chase XC-123A
J47-GE-13
(TG-190C) Powered the North American F-86E Sabre, Martin XB-51 and North American B-45C Tornado
J47-GE-15
(7E-TG-190C) Powered the North American B-45C Tornado
J47-GE-17
(7E-TG-190D) 5,425 pounds-force (24 kN) at 7,950 rpm dry, 7,350 pounds-force (33 kN) at 7,950 rpm wet, powered the North American F-86D Sabre, Republic XF-91 Thunderceptor (second engine)
J47-GE-17B
5,425 pounds-force (24 kN), powered the North American F-86D Sabre
J47-GE-19
(TG-190C) 5,200 pounds-force (23 kN), powered the Convair B-36D & B-36F
J47-GE-23
(7E-TG-190E) 5,800 pounds-force (26 kN), powered the Boeing B-47B and RB-47B, Boeing B-50D Superfortress, Boeing KC-97L Stratofreighter. Used as a mixed propulsion system with the P&W R-4360 Wasp Major (B-50 and KC-97).
J47-GE-25
5,970 pounds-force (27 kN) / 6,970 pounds-force (31 kN) with water injection, powered the Boeing B-47E and RB-47E
J47-PM-25
(TG-190E) Production by Packard Motor Car Company
J47-ST-25
(TG-190E) Production by Studebaker Corp.
J47-GE-27
(TG-190E) 5,970 pounds-force (27 kN), powered the North American F-86F Sabre
J47-GE-29
(TG-190E) Similar to -27
J47-GE-33
5,550 pounds-force (25 kN), powered the F-86F & F-86K

== Applications ==
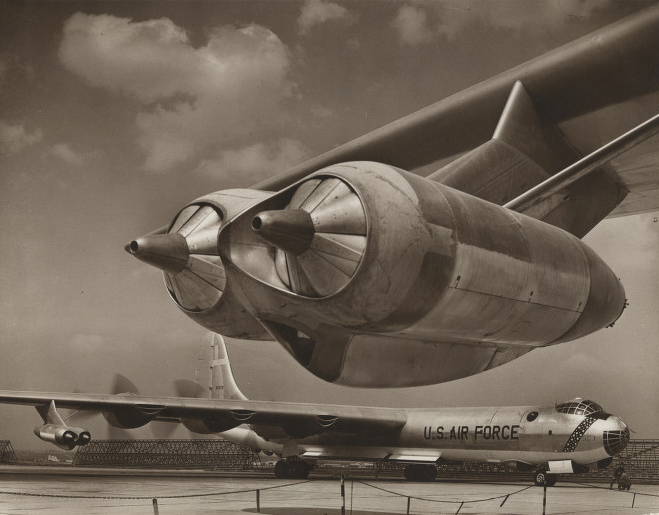
Two J47 turbojet engines were mounted outboard of the three Pratt & Whitney R-4360 Wasp Major piston engines on each wing of the B-36.

- Boeing B-47 Stratojet
- Boeing KB-50J Superfortress
- Boeing KC-97 Stratofreighter
- Chase XC-123A
- Convair B-36 Peacemaker
- Convair NB-36
- Curtiss XF-87 Blackhawk
- Martin XB-51
- North American B-45 Tornado
- North American F-86 Sabre
- North American F-86D Sabre
- North American FJ-2 Fury
- Republic XF-91 Thunderceptor

Ground-based vehicles that used the engine include:

- Spirit of America
- M-497 Black Beetle jet-powered railcar

== Nuclear-powered X39 ==
In the 1950s, interest in the development of nuclear-powered aircraft led GE to experiment with two nuclear-powered gas turbine designs, one based on the J47, and another new and much larger engine called the X211.

The design based on the J47 became the X39 program. This system consisted of two modified J47 engines which, instead of combusting jet fuel, received their heated, compressed air from a heat exchanger that was part of the Heat Transfer Reactor Experiment (HTRE) reactor. The X-39 was successfully operated in conjunction with three different reactors, the HTRE-1, HTRE-2 and HTRE-3. Had the program not been cancelled, these engines would have been used to power the proposed Convair X-6.

== Specifications (J47-GE-25) ==
Data from

==== General characteristics ====
- Type: turbojet
- Length: 145 inches (370 cm) (with tailcone)
- Diameter: 36.75 inches (93.3 cm) maximum
- Dry weight: 2,554 pounds (1,158 kg) dry, equipped

==== Components ====
- Compressor: 12-stage axial compressor
- Turbine: single-stage axial
- Fuel type: JP-1, JP-2, JP-3, JP-4 or MIL-F-5572 gasoline
- Oil system: pressure feed spray with scavenge

==== Performance ====
- Maximum thrust: 5,970 lbf (26.56 kN) at 7950 rpm; 6,970 lbf (31.00 kN) with water injection
- Overall pressure ratio: 5.35
- Air mass flow: 92 lb/s (42 kg/s)
- Specific fuel consumption: 1.014 lb/(lbf⋅h) (28.7 g/(kN⋅s))
- Thrust-to-weight ratio: 2.34 at take-off dry power

== See also ==
- United States military aircraft engine designations

Related development

- General Electric J35
- General Electric J73

Comparable engines

- Armstrong Siddeley Sapphire
- Rolls-Royce Avon
- Avro Canada Orenda

Related lists

- List of aircraft engines
