= Tupolev Tu-95LAL =

Soviet experimental nuclear-powered bomber

Tu-95LAL
- The Tu-95LAL test aircraft. The bulge in the fuselage aft of the wing covers the reactor.

General information
- Type: Experimental nuclear aircraft
- Manufacturer: Tupolev
- Number built: 1

History
- First flight: 1961
- Developed from: Tupolev Tu-95

The Tupolev Tu-95LAL experimental aircraft (Russian: Летающая Атомная Лаборатория, romanized: Letayushchaya Atomnaya Laboratoriya, lit. 'flying atomic laboratory') which flew from 1961 to 1965 was a modified Tupolev Tu-95 Soviet bomber aircraft, analogous to the United States' earlier Convair NB-36H. It was intended to see whether a nuclear reactor could be used to power an aircraft, primarily testing airborne operation of a reactor and shielding for components and crew. The reactor did not actually power the aircraft.

== Design and development ==
During the Cold War the USSR had an experimental nuclear aircraft program. Without the need to refuel, a nuclear-powered aircraft would have greatly extended range compared to conventional designs.

On 12 August 1955 the Council of Ministers of the USSR issued a directive ordering bomber-related design bureaus to join forces in researching nuclear aircraft. The design bureaus of Andrei Tupolev and Vladimir Myasishchev became the chief design teams, while N. D. Kuznetsov and A. M. Lyulka were assigned to develop the engines. They chose to focus on the direct-cycle system from the start, testing ramjets, jet engines and even turboprops.

The Tupolev bureau, knowing the complexity of the task assigned to them, estimated that it would be two decades before the program could produce a working prototype. They assumed that the first operational nuclear-assisted airplane could take to the air in the late 1970s or early 1980s. In order to gain experience with operational problems, they proposed building a flying testbed as soon as possible, mounting a small reactor in a Tupolev Tu-95M to create the Tu-95LAL.

The VVRL-lOO reactor was fitted in the bomb bay of the aircraft, requiring aerodynamic fairings over the top and bottom. From 1961 to 1969, the Tu-95LAL completed over 40 research flights. Most of these were made with the reactor shut down. The main purpose of the flight phase was examining the effectiveness of the radiation shielding, which was one of the main concerns for the engineers. Liquid sodium, beryllium oxide, cadmium, paraffin wax and steel plates were used for protection. The shielding efficiency is disputed: most sources say that it was at least efficient enough to warrant further work, and indeed, the design of the follow-up prototype, the Tu-119, was started.

As in the US, development was curtailed on grounds of cost and environmental concerns. The emerging potential of intercontinental ballistic missiles made the expensive nuclear aircraft program superfluous, and it was scaled back.

== Tu-119 ==
The next stage in the development of a nuclear-powered bomber would have been the Tupolev Tu-119, a modified Tu-95, which would have been powered by two kerosene-fed Kuznetsov NK-12 turboprops outboard and two Kuznetsov NK-14A nuclear-fuelled engines inboard, fed with heat from the fuselage-mounted reactor. The project was cancelled in its early stages, as the whole concept of nuclear airplane propulsion was evaluated as too expensive and environmentally dangerous.

== Specifications (Tu-95LAL) ==
Note: the specifications given are those of the Tu-95MS, which were identical to the Tu-95LAL.

Data from Combat Aircraft Since 1945

General characteristics

- Length: 46.2 m (151 ft 7 in)
- Wingspan: 50.1 m (164 ft 4 in)
- Height: 12.12 m (39 ft 9 in)
- Wing area: 310 m^{2} (3,300 sq ft)
- Gross weight: 145,000 kg (319,670 lb) *Landing weight: 110,000 kg (242,508 lb)
- Powerplant: 4 × Kuznetsov NK-12M turboprop engines 15,000 PS (15,000 hp; 11,000 kW)
- Propellers: 8-bladed contra-rotating constant-speed fully feathering propellers

Performance

- Cruise speed: 750–800 km/h (470–500 mph, 400–430 kn)
- Range: 4,700 km (2,900 mi, 2,500 nmi)
- Endurance: >6.4 hours

== See also ==
Aircraft of comparable role, configuration, and era

- Convair X-6
- Convair NB-36H
- Myasishchev M-60
