= Experimental Breeder Reactor I =

Breeder reactor in Idaho, US

- Experimental Breeder Reactor No. 1
- U.S. National Register of Historic Places
- U.S. National Historic Landmark
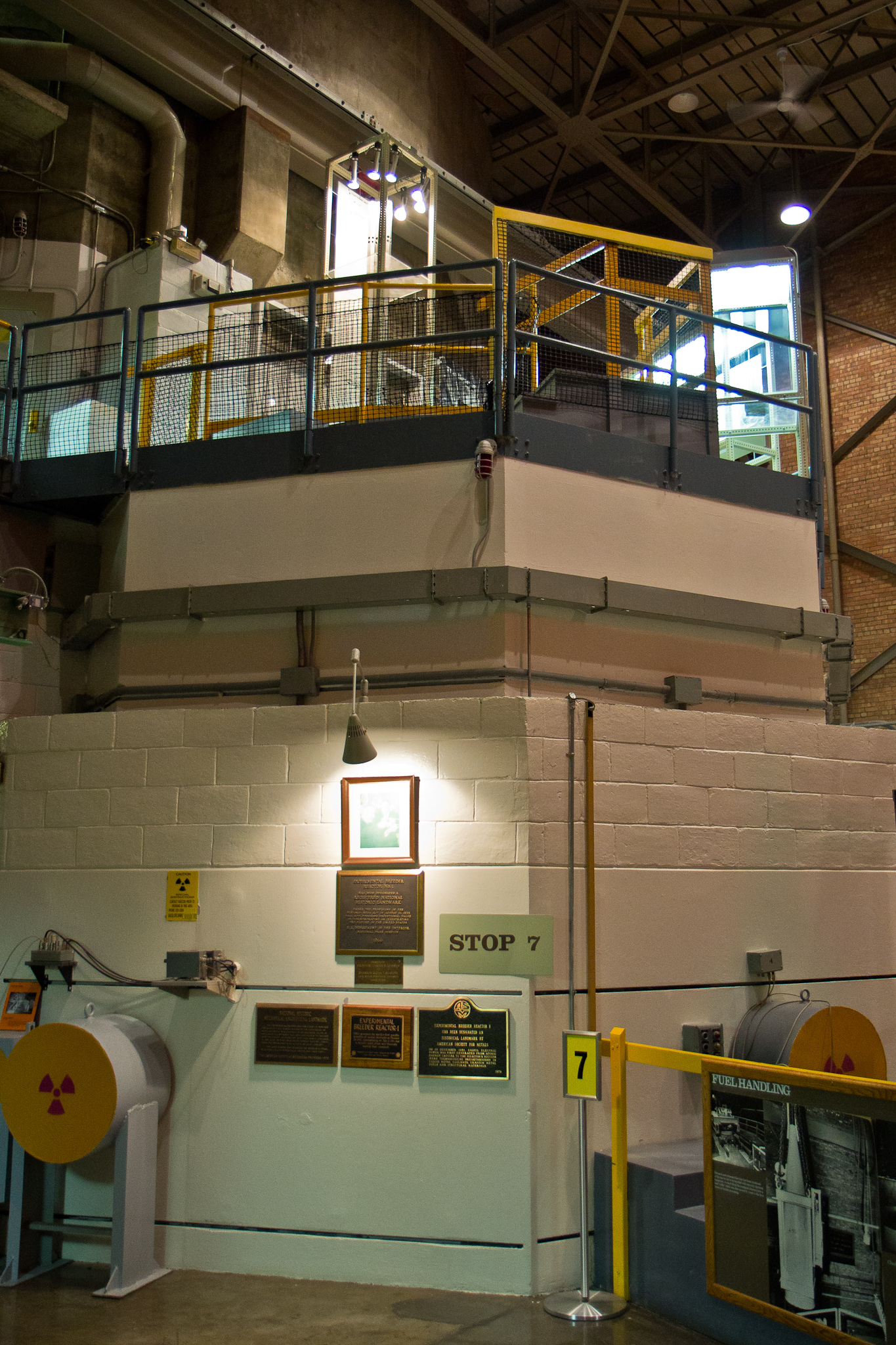
- Experimental Breeder Reactor Number 1 in Idaho, the first power reactor

- Location within Idaho Location within the United States
- Location: Butte County, Idaho, US
- Nearest city: Arco, Idaho
- Coordinates: 43.51132°N 113.0064°W
- Built: 1950
- Architect: Atomic Energy Commission
- NRHP reference No.: 66000307

Significant dates
- Added to NRHP: October 15, 1966
- Designated NHL: December 21, 1965

Experimental Breeder Reactor I (EBR-I) is a decommissioned research reactor and U.S. National Historic Landmark located in the desert about 18 miles (29 km) southeast of Arco, Idaho. It was the world's first breeder reactor. At 1:50 p.m. on December 20, 1951, it became one of the world's first electricity-generating nuclear power plants when it produced sufficient electricity to illuminate four 200-watt light bulbs. EBR-I soon generated sufficient electricity to power its building and the town of Arco, and continued to be used for experimental research until it was decommissioned in 1964. The museum is open for visitors from Memorial Day weekend through Labor Day weekend.

== History ==
EBR-I's construction started in late 1949. The reactor was designed and built by a team led by Walter Zinn at the Idaho site of the Argonne National Laboratory, known as Argonne-West (since 2005 part of Idaho National Laboratory). In its early stages, the reactor plant was referred to as Chicago Pile-4 (CP-4) and Zinn's Infernal Pile. Installation of the reactor at EBR-I took place in early 1951 (the first reactor in Idaho) and it began power operation on August 24, 1951. On December 20 of that year, EBR-I produced electricity for its first time. The following day, the reactor produced enough power to light the whole building. The EBR-I produced 200 kW of electricity out of 1.4 MW of heat generated by the reactor.

The production of electricity at EBR-I is the first time that a reactor created in-house available electricity, and it is sometimes misreferred to as the first time that a nuclear reactor has ever created electricity, or powered a light bulb. However, the world's first electricity produced by a nuclear reactor occurred during an experiment 3 years earlier in September 1948 at the X-10 Graphite Reactor at the Oak Ridge National Lab in Tennessee. A small steam turbine allowed that reactor to power a single light bulb. Later in 1955, another nuclear milestone was reached when an experimental boiling water reactor plant called BORAX-III (also designed, built, and operated by Argonne National Laboratory) was connected to external loads, powering the nearby city of Arco, Idaho, the first time a city had been powered solely by nuclear power.

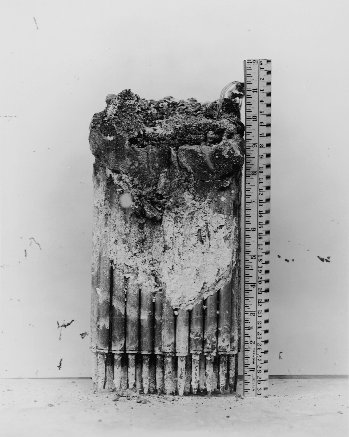
Part of the core after the 1955 partial meltdown

The design purpose of EBR-I was not to produce electricity but instead to validate nuclear physics theory that suggested that a breeder reactor should be possible. The concept suggested using a reactor's neutron radiation to convert or "breed" a blanket of fertile material into new fissile material. The reaction used in EBR-I's design was the breeding of uranium-238 into plutonium via fast neutrons:

$\ce{{}^{238}_{92}U + {}^{1}_{0}n -> {}^{239}_{92}U ->[\beta^-][23.5\ \ce{min}] {}^{239}_{93}Np ->[\beta^-][2.356\ \ce{d}] {}^{239}_{94}Pu}$

This reaction had already been used in the X-10 Graphite Reactor and Hanford Site B, D, F, and DR reactors to produce plutonium for the Gadget, Fat Man, and further pits. However, the Hanford reactors would only yield about 0.025% of fissile ^{239}Pu, from the fissile ^{235}U content of 0.7% in the natural uranium fuel slugs. This corresponds to a "conversion ratio" of 1/30. The EBR-I design aimed to increase this by limiting neutron loss and maintaining a fast spectrum, achieving a ratio above one. In EBR-I, the ratio was experimentally calculated as:

$\text{conversion ratio} = \frac{\text{fissile atoms created}}{\text{fissile atoms destroyed}} = \frac{^{239}\text{Pu production}}{^{235}\text{U fission} \ + \ ^{236}\text{U production}}$

In 1956, an AEC report concluded a radiochemically measured conversion ratio of 1.00 ± 0.04, and a physically measured ratio of 1.01 ± 0.05, tentatively making it the world's first breeder reactor.

On November 29, 1955, the reactor at EBR-I suffered a partial meltdown during a coolant flow test. The flow test was trying to determine the cause of unexpected reactor responses to changes in coolant flow. It was subsequently repaired for further experiments, which determined that thermal expansion of the fuel rods and the thick plates supporting the fuel rods was the cause of the unexpected reactor response.

Besides being one of the world's first to generate plant electricity from atomic energy, EBR-I was also the world's first breeder reactor and the first to use plutonium fuel to generate electricity (see also the Clementine nuclear reactor). EBR-I's initial purpose was to prove Enrico Fermi's fuel breeding principle, a principle that a nuclear reactor can produce more fuel atoms than it consumes. EBR-I proved this principle.

=== Design ===
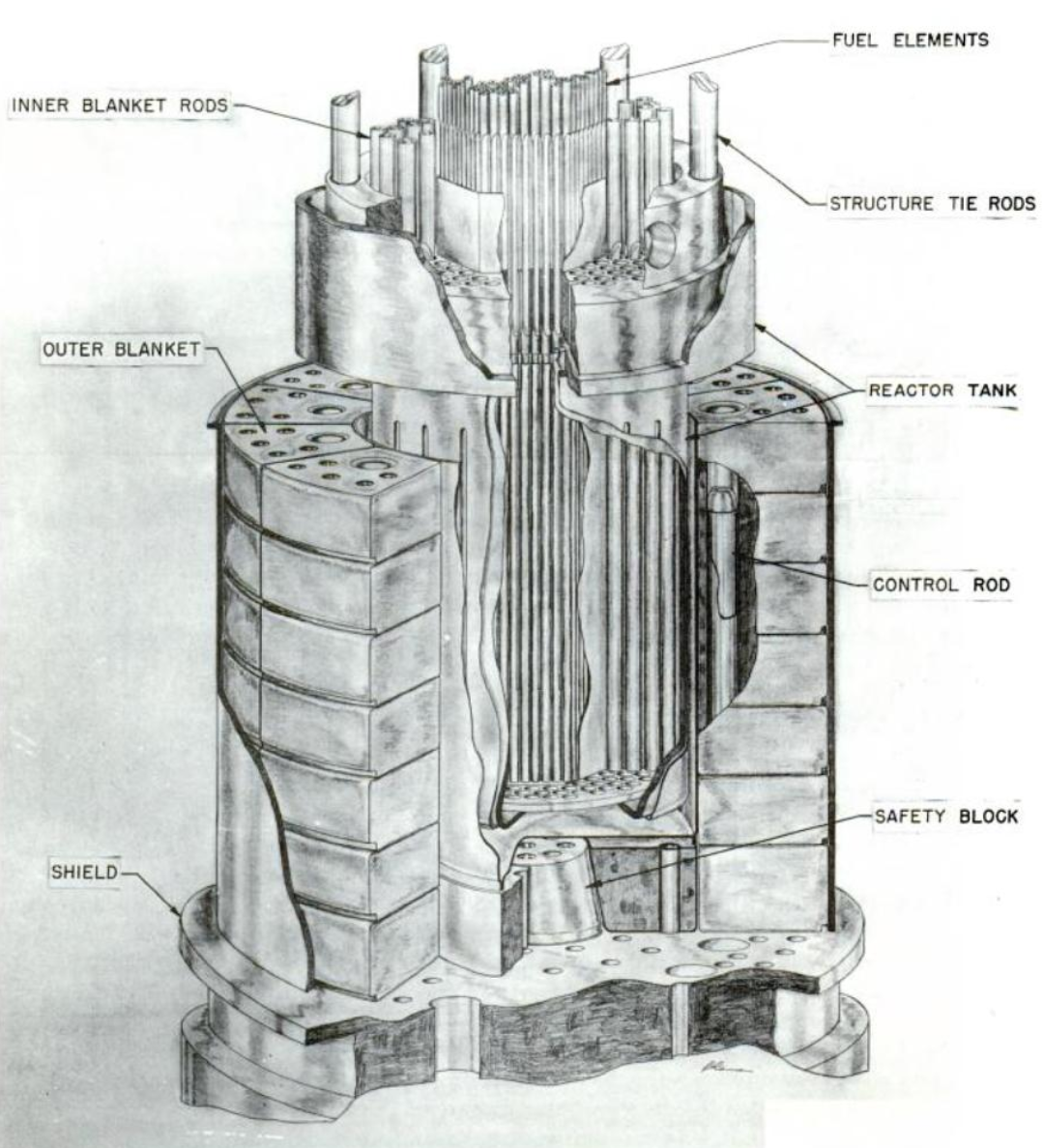
Cutaway diagram of EBR-I, showing the core, inner blanket rods, coolant tank, and outer blanket and control rods.

As a breeder reactor, EBR-I used a "seed-and-blanket design". The core "seed" was highly enriched uranium at 90% uranium-235. The inner blanket contained rods of natural uranium at 0.7% uranium-235 content. This structure was surrounded by the double-walled tank containing the NaK primary coolant. This tank was surrounded by the air-cooled outer blanket of natural uranium, used for its effective neutron reflecting properties, and which also contained the control rods. The outer blanket was the movable component, as technique for moving parts within liquid metal were in early stages. However the air-cooling greatly limited the maximum operating power, which was reached at 1.4 MWth.

The primary liquid metal coolant flows by gravity from the supply tank through the reactor core, where it absorbs heat. Then, the coolant flows to heat the exchanger, where it gives up this heat to the secondary coolant, another liquid metal. The primary coolant is returned to the supply tank by an electromagnetic pump. The secondary coolant is pumped to the boiler, where it gives up its heat to water, generating steam. This steam passes to the turbine, which is how electricity is produced. This steam then condenses and returned to the boiler by a water pump. This coolant design was shared by the later Dounreay Fast Reactor which first went critical in 1959.

=== Decommission and legacy ===
EBR-I was deactivated by Argonne in 1964 and replaced with a new reactor, Experimental Breeder Reactor II.

It was declared a National Historic Landmark in 1965 with its dedication ceremony held on August 25, 1966, led by President Lyndon Johnson and Glenn T. Seaborg. It was also declared an IEEE Milestone in 2004.

== Gallery ==
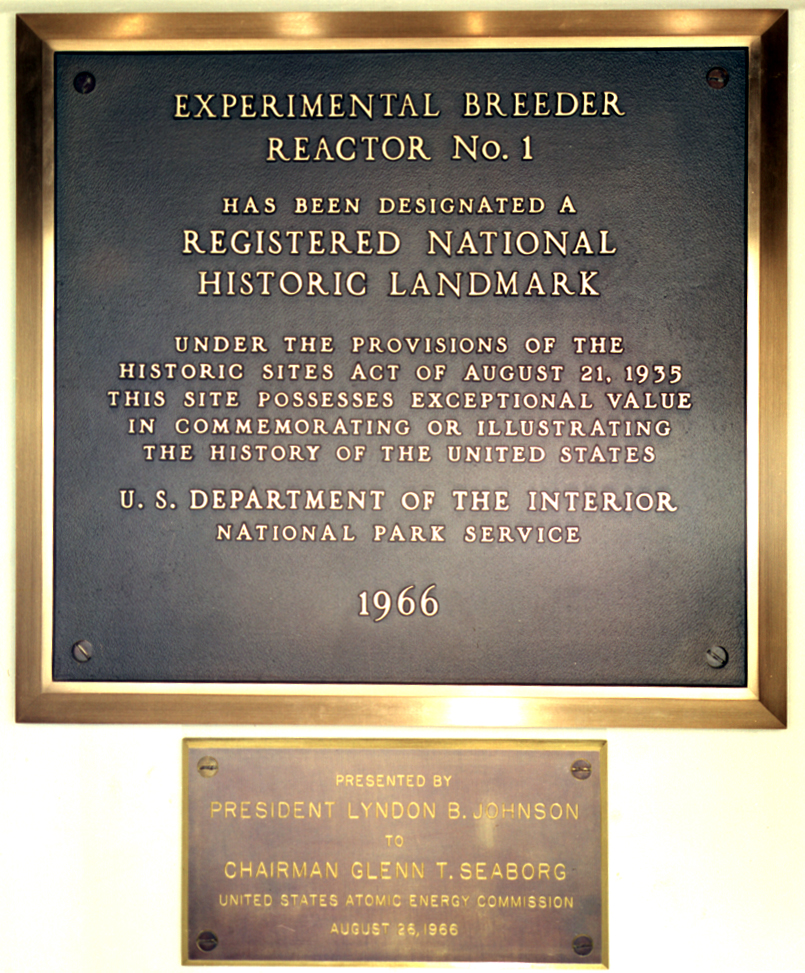
Plaques at the EBR-I site

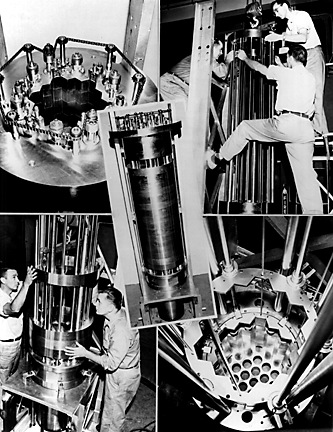
Assembly of the core, 1951
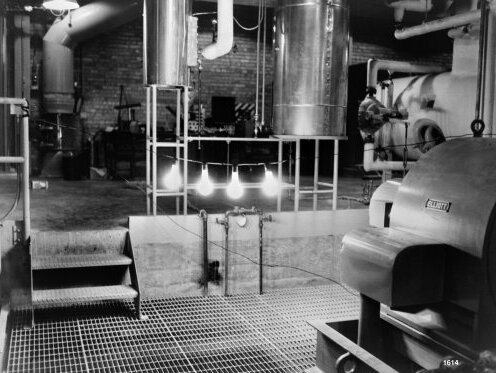
The first production of electricity at EBR-I occurred on December 20, 1951, when four light bulbs were lit

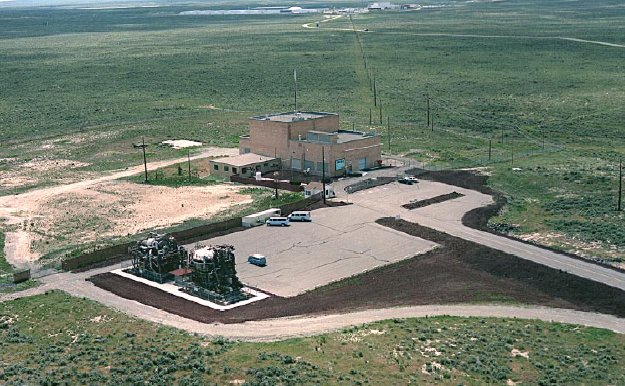
The reactor is in the building at center; the two structures lower left are reactors from the Aircraft Nuclear Propulsion Project.

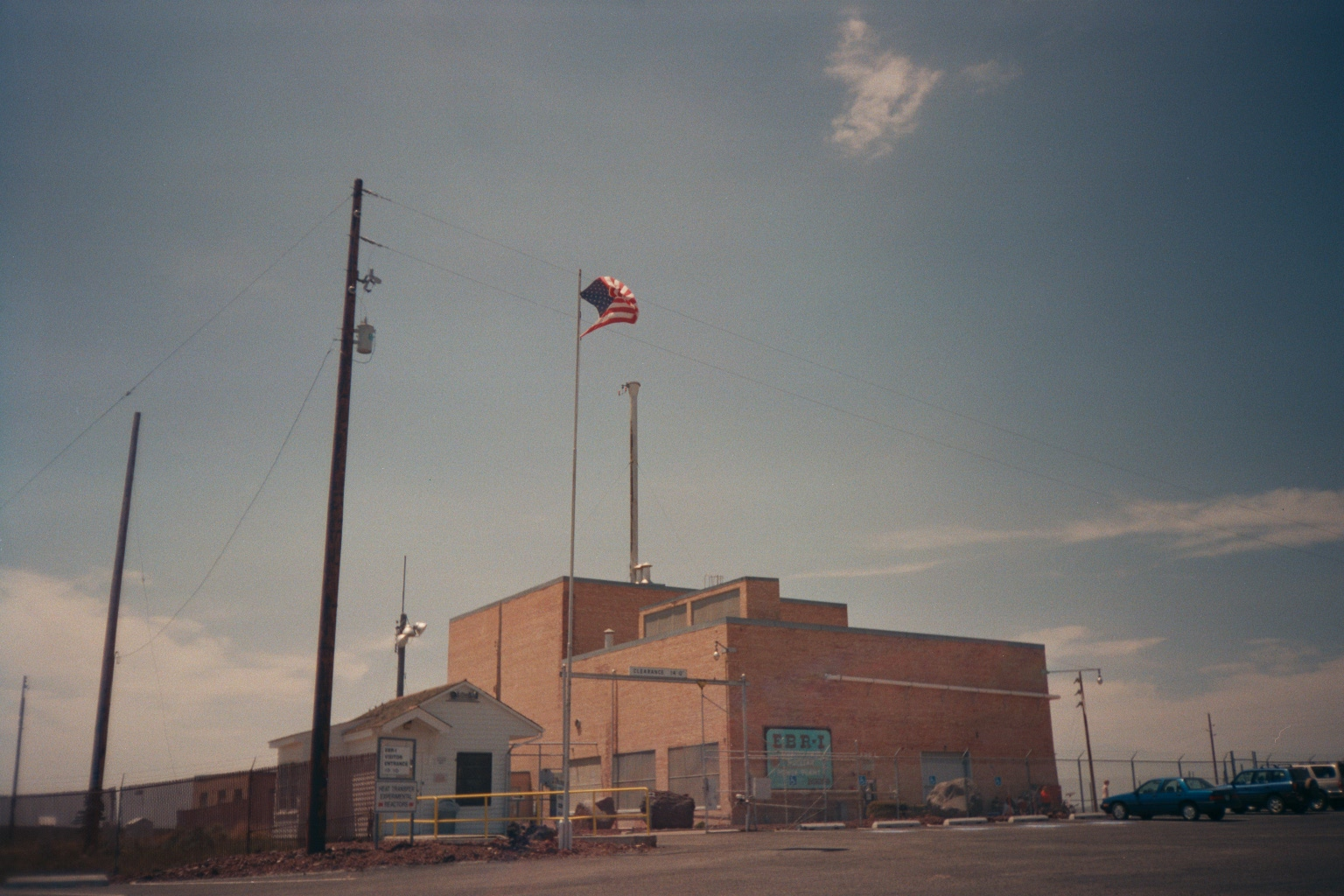
View of EBR-I, from the parking lot

== See also ==
- Calder Hall, England, the first nuclear power station to deliver power in commercial quantities.
- Chicago Pile-1 and -2
- Chicago Pile-3
- List of National Historic Landmarks in Idaho
- National Register of Historic Places listings in Butte County, Idaho
- Obninsk Nuclear Power Plant, 5MWe, the first nuclear reactor to supply electricity to a power grid.
