= LASV =

LASV may refer to:

- Lassa mammarenavirus, a virus that causes Lassa fever
- Liberation Army of South Vietnam, a former military force
- Low Altitude Supersonic Vehicle, in Project Pluto

== See also ==
- Supersonic Low Altitude Missile (SLAM)
