= 77 Sunset Strip =

American crime drama television series (1958–1964)

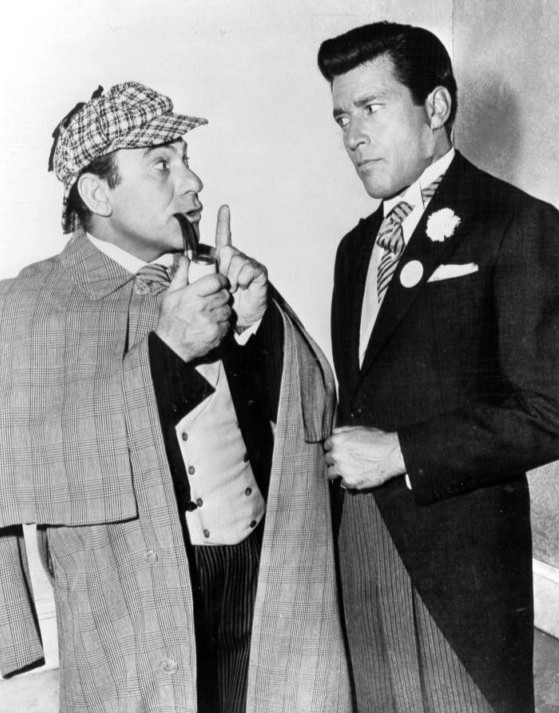
- Louis Quinn and Efrem Zimbalist Jr., 1962
- Genre: Crime drama
- Created by: Roy Huggins
- Directed by: Irving J. Moore et al
- Starring: Efrem Zimbalist Jr.; Roger Smith; Edward Byrnes; Richard Long; Louis Quinn; Jacqueline Beer; Robert Logan; Joan Staley
- Theme music composer: Mack David; Jerry Livingston (original); Bob Thompson
- Composers: Max Steiner; Jack Halloran
- Country of origin: United States
- Original language: English
- No. of seasons: 6
- No. of episodes: 206 (list of episodes)

Production
- Executive producers: William T. Orr; Jack Webb
- Producers: Howie Horwitz; Harry Tatelman; William Conrad; Jerry Davis; Fenton Earnshaw; Joel Rogosin; Roy Huggins
- Camera setup: Single-camera
- Running time: 48–50 minutes
- Production company: Warner Bros. Television

Original release
- Network: ABC
- Release: October 10, 1958 – February 7, 1964

Related
- I Love Trouble; Conflict; Surfside 6; Bourbon Street Beat; Hawaiian Eye

77 Sunset Strip is an American private detective crime drama television series created by Roy Huggins and starring Efrem Zimbalist Jr., Roger Smith, Richard Long (from 1960 to 1961) and Edd Byrnes (billed as Edward Byrnes). Each episode was one hour long when aired with commercials. The series aired on ABC from October 10, 1958, to February 7, 1964. The character of detective Stuart Bailey was first used by writer Huggins in his 1946 novel The Double Take, later adapted into the 1948 film I Love Trouble.

== Description ==
=== Initial setup and characters ===
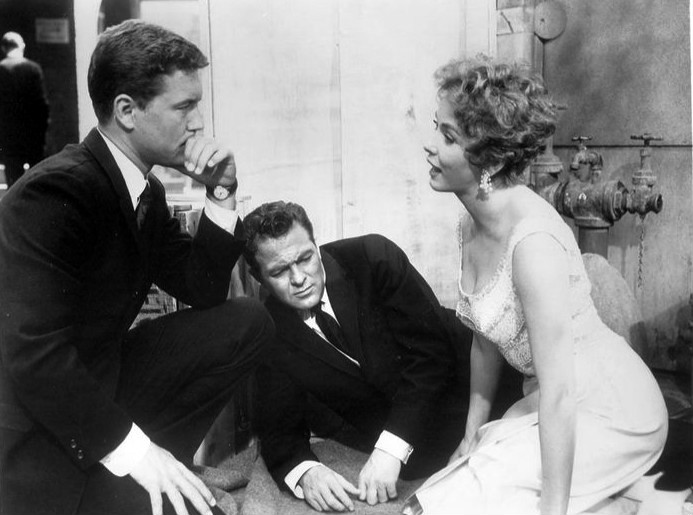
Roger Smith with guest stars Biff Elliot and Maureen Leeds, 1961

Private detective and former World War II Office of Strategic Services secret agent and foreign languages professor Stuart ("Stu") Bailey (Zimbalist) and former government agent and nonpracticing attorney Jeff Spencer (Smith) form a duo who work from stylish offices at 77 Sunset Boulevard in Suites 101 and 102. Tab Hunter was the first choice for the lead of the series, but turned it down.

The street address was colloquially known as the Sunset Strip and was between La Cienega Boulevard and Alta Loma Road on the south side of the strip, next door to Dean Martin's real-life lounge, Dino's Lodge. Typically the two detectives would alternate as leads, with a Stuart Bailey case being featured one week and a Jeff Spencer case the next—although depending on the nature of the case, sometimes the two would team up.

Suzanne Fabry, the French switchboard operator played by Jacqueline Beer, handles the phones for Sunset Answering Service, in Suite 103. The firm of Bailey & Spencer employs her answering service, as do other clients. Although not technically an employee of the firm, Suzanne is involved in casework from time to time, especially in Season 2.

Comic relief is provided by Roscoe the racetrack tout (played by Louis Quinn), who frequently hangs around the offices giving horse-racing tips. However he is sometimes used as an operative and is an ever-informed source for the word on the street.

The firm's most frequently seen police contact is Lt. Roy Gilmore (Byron Keith), who is almost never called by his first name.

The show's breakout character, who had not been included in the pilot film, was Gerald Lloyd "Kookie" Kookson III (Edd Byrnes), the rock and roll-loving, wisecracking, hair-combing hipster and aspiring PI who initially works as the valet parking attendant at Dino's, the club next to the detectives' office. Kookie often becomes involved in the firm's cases and is eventually made a full partner in the firm, with his own office.

Also seen relatively frequently are the Frank Ortega Trio, playing themselves as the jazzy house band at Dino's Lodge.

=== Tone and cultural impact ===
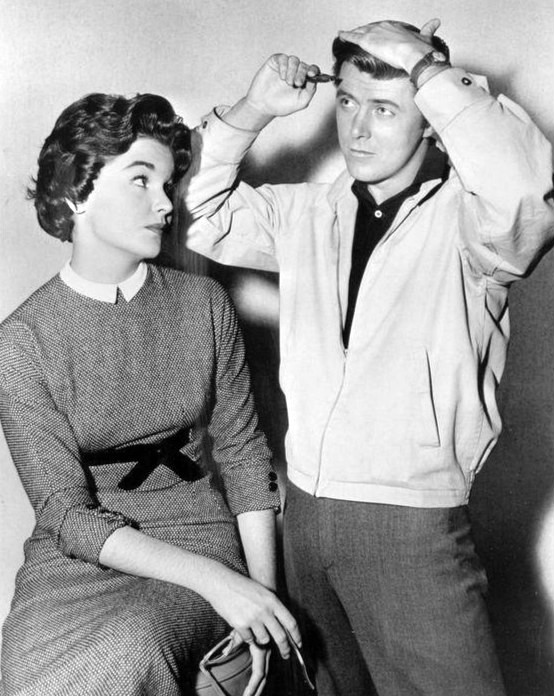
Sue Randall and "Kookie", 1964

Huggins intended the show to be a hard-edged drama, but beginning with the 23rd episode, "The Pasadena Caper", the tone started to become much lighter, with a strong element of self-deprecating humor and the word "caper" frequently used in episode titles. The catchy theme song, written by Mack David and Jerry Livingston, typified the show's breezy, jazzed atmosphere. The song became the centerpiece of an album of the show's music in Warren Barker orchestrations, which was released in 1959, a top-10 hit in the Billboard LP charts.

The Kookie character became a cultural phenomenon, with his slang expressions such as "ginchy" (cool) and "piling up Zs" (sleeping). When Kookie helped the detectives on a case by singing a song, Edd Byrnes began a singing career with the novelty single "Kookie, Kookie (Lend Me Your Comb)", based on his frequent combing of his hair; this featured Connie Stevens on vocals in the chorus and the song, with words and music by Irving Taylor. The song became the first hit single for the recently established Warner Bros. Records. Kookie was also used to provide product placement for Harley-Davidson, appearing on their Topper motor scooter in the show and in Harley-Davidson advertisements.

The show became the first "franchise" in television, spawning no fewer than three spinoffs recreating the "77" format, a team of private detectives, their secretary and sidekick, solving cases, in picturesque cities. Surfside Six was set in Miami Beach; Hawaiian Eye's home base was Honolulu. Bourbon Street Beat saw a similar detective agency located in New Orleans. In some cases, 77 scripts were recycled and rewritten to fit the characters of each series. It was the genesis of the concept that drives contemporary shows such as Law & Order, NCIS, CSI and the Chicago P.D./Chicago Med/Chicago Fire series, as well as 9-1-1.

=== Cast changes during Seasons 1–5 ===
When Byrnes' demands for more money and an expanded role were not met, he left the show for a period in Season 2. After an absence of 16 episodes beginning in January 1960, Byrnes and Warner Bros. settled their differences, and Kookie came back beginning in May. (During his absence, Roscoe's and Suzanne's roles were beefed up to handle the work normally assigned to Kookie.)

For the 1960–61 season, Richard Long (who appeared in different roles in two Season 1 episodes) moved over from the recently canceled detective series Bourbon Street Beat. His character of Rex Randolph from Bourbon Street Beat was said to have left New Orleans and relocated to North Hollywood, joining Bailey and Spencer's firm and taking Office 104. The character was dropped after one season, but Long (once again playing different one-shot guest characters) was seen again on 77 Sunset Strip in Seasons 5 and 6.

Kookie became a full-fledged detective and partner in the firm as of Season 4, taking over Rex Randolph's office in 104. At the same time, Robert Logan became the new parking-lot attendant, J.R. Hale, who usually speaks in abbreviations. Hale is seen throughout Seasons 4 and 5.

=== Episode and guest cast highlights ===
One of the series' more unusual episodes was 1960's "The Silent Caper", written by Smith. As the title suggests, the episode presented its story completely without dialogue. Another offbeat entry was 1961's "Reserved for Mr. Bailey", which finds Zimbalist alone in a ghost town. He is the only main actor on screen for the entire hour. (This episode was not included in the syndication package, and many fans had expressed their frustration at being unable to see it again. After 56 years out of circulation, it finally resurfaced on MeTV on June 17, 2017.)

The show was so popular that rising young actors clamored for guest spots. Up-and-comers who made guest appearances include: Ellen Burstyn, Tony Young, Roger Moore, Anthony Call, DeForest Kelley, Don Dubbins, Wynn Pearce, William Shatner, Mary Tyler Moore, Lew Gallo, Patrick Waltz, Shirley MacLaine look-alike Gigi Verone, Robert Conrad, Dyan Cannon, Janet De Gore, Arthur Hanson, Jay North, Connie Stevens, Sherwood Price, Fred Beir, Irish McCalla, John Goddard, Adam West, Tuesday Weld, Sherry Jackson, Karl Lukas, Mario Alcalde, Joyce Meadows, Ron Hagerthy, Marlo Thomas, Penny Santon, Max Baer Jr., James Chandler, Carole Mathews, Chuck Hicks, Elizabeth Montgomery, Karen Steele, Nesdon Booth, Randy Stuart, Richard Garland, Susan Oliver, Robert Vaughn, Suzanne Storrs, Albert Carrier, Peter Breck, William Kendis, Donna Douglas, Troy Donahue, Chad Everett, Joel Lawrence, Yuki Shimoda, Gena Rowlands, Cloris Leachman, Maureen Leeds, Eve McVeagh, and Diane Ladd.

Established film and TV actors and older stars who guest-starred include Fay Wray, Rusty Lane, Frank J. Scannell, Gordon Jones, Francis X. Bushman, Sidney Clute, Kem Dibbs, E. J. André, Rodolfo Hoyos Jr., John Cliff, Ida Lupino, Liliane Montevecchi, Rico Alaniz, Fred Sherman, Ken Mayer, Stephen Chase, Baynes Barron, Russ Conway, Jess Kirkpatrick, Joseph Mell, Keenan Wynn, Gregory Morton, Rolfe Sedan, Jim Backus, Sam Gilman, Clark Howat, Paul Newlan, Billie Burke, Lou Krugman, Ken Lynch, Alfred Shelly, Richard Collier, Art Balinger, Frances Fong, Richard Devon, Gregg Palmer, Richard Reeves, Dayton Lummis, Buddy Ebsen, Roger Til, Stephen Roberts, George Jessel, Richard Shannon, Peter Lorre, Rodolfo Hoyos Jr., Herbert Lytton, Boris Karloff, Mel Prestidge, Burgess Meredith, Cosmo Sardo, Nick Adams, Joe Ploski, Robert Burton, Spencer Chan, Gerald Mohr and Roy Roberts, among others. The show occasionally featured sports stars such as Sandy Koufax in guest roles.

== The controversial sixth season, 1963–1964 ==
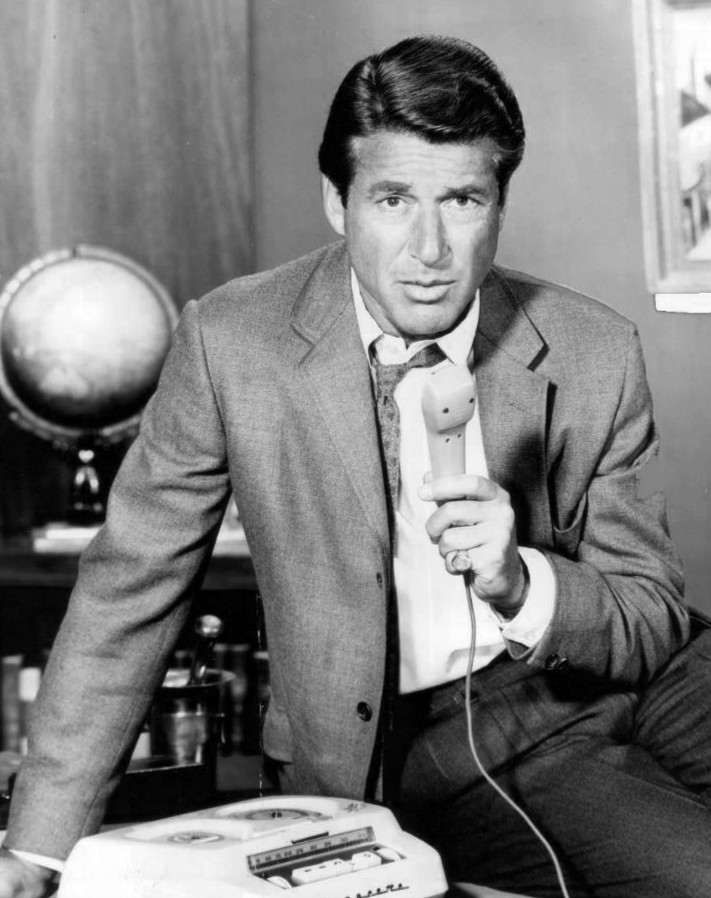
Efrem Zimbalist Jr., 1963

In 1963, as the show's popularity waned, the entire cast was dismissed except for Zimbalist. Jack Webb was brought in as executive producer and William Conrad as a producer/director. The character of Stuart Bailey was presented as a solo private investigator, with no continuity or reference to his past years with Jeff Spencer, Suzanne, Kookie and Roscoe or to his military OSS background. It was an abrupt, unexplained disconnect; the new 77 Sunset Strip was virtually an entirely different show that just happened to use the same title and lead character name. In particular, the smoothly professional investigator who maintained good relationships with clients and police alike was gone; this iteration of Stu Bailey had an intense hatred of the police, and a deeply cynical, smart-mouthed attitude about nearly everything else. The series and Bailey's personality took on a darker tone, and the familiar office, parking lot and Dino's Lodge were gone. A new musical theme was written by Bob Thompson.

The Season 6 show title was not changed; it still was an address, but Bailey's new office is dramatically different from that which he shared with Spencer for the previous five years. The interior of Bailey's new office building is shown behind the show's opening and closing credits, forcing viewers to ponder how the same address could look so very different (it was actually the historic Bradbury Building in downtown Los Angeles). There seemed to be no spoken mention of his office address in the Season 6 shows, although in the episode "Bonus Baby" when a police officer inspects Bailey's private investigator license, a close-up shows the address "77 Sunset Strip."

As the season progressed, there were some shifts in tone. Several episodes into the season, Bailey's stern personality became lighter, though still different from that of prior seasons. His secretary Hannah, previously known to Season 6 viewers only because Bailey addressed her in his recorded dictations, was seen on screen beginning with the season's 11th episode. Played by Joan Staley, Hannah worked in Bailey's office, where he developed a romantic interest in her—but she continually stymied and frustrated him by playing hard-to-get.

As of episode "Alimony League" (the 16th of the season's 20 episodes), the opening and closing background shots of the Bradbury Building were gone, replaced by Bailey in silhouette walking past lighted store windows. This was actually a scene from "5" (the sixth-season opener) and it was supposedly located in New York City where Bailey arrived to work for a client to "pay his dead brother's way into heaven."

The episode "The Target" was unusual because key roles were played by the show's primary behind-the-scenes crew, who happened to also be experienced actors. Show producer William Conrad played Maestrian, associate producer James Lydon played Charlie, writer Tony Barrett played Carnovan and director Lawrence Dobkin played Landers. Executive producer Jack Webb can also be seen briefly as a bystander.

Viewers did not appreciate the numerous changes to the show, and it was canceled halfway through its sixth season in February 1964. In the 1964 summer reruns period, shows from the Bailey and Spencer years were shown, and the Season 6 episodes were abandoned, rarely seen until September 2017 on MeTV.

== Broadcast history ==
NOTE: The most frequent time slot for the series is in bold text.

- Friday at 9:30–10:30 pm on ABC: October 10, 1958 – May 29, 1959; October 12, 1962 – June 14, 1963
- **Friday at 9:00–10:00 pm on ABC: October 2, 1959 – June 29, 1962**
- Friday at 7:30–8:30 pm on ABC: September 20, 1963 – February 7, 1964

== Related shows ==
The success of 77 Sunset Strip led to the creation of several other detective shows in exotic locales, all produced by the Warner Bros. studio, which created Strip — Bourbon Street Beat in New Orleans with Richard Long and Andrew Duggan, Hawaiian Eye in Honolulu with Robert Conrad and Connie Stevens, and Surfside 6 in Miami Beach with Troy Donahue and Van Williams. The casts and scripts of these various shows sometimes crossed over, which was logistically easy, since they were all shot in Burbank on the Warner Bros. lot. Some of the detectives, played by the same actors, became regulars in other series after their original series had been cancelled.

The office and bar/nightclub sets of 77 Sunset Strip and Hawaiian Eye were on the same WB soundstage, intertwined to save space, with shared room walls and some doors actually going between the sets (not obvious to viewers).

== Legacy ==
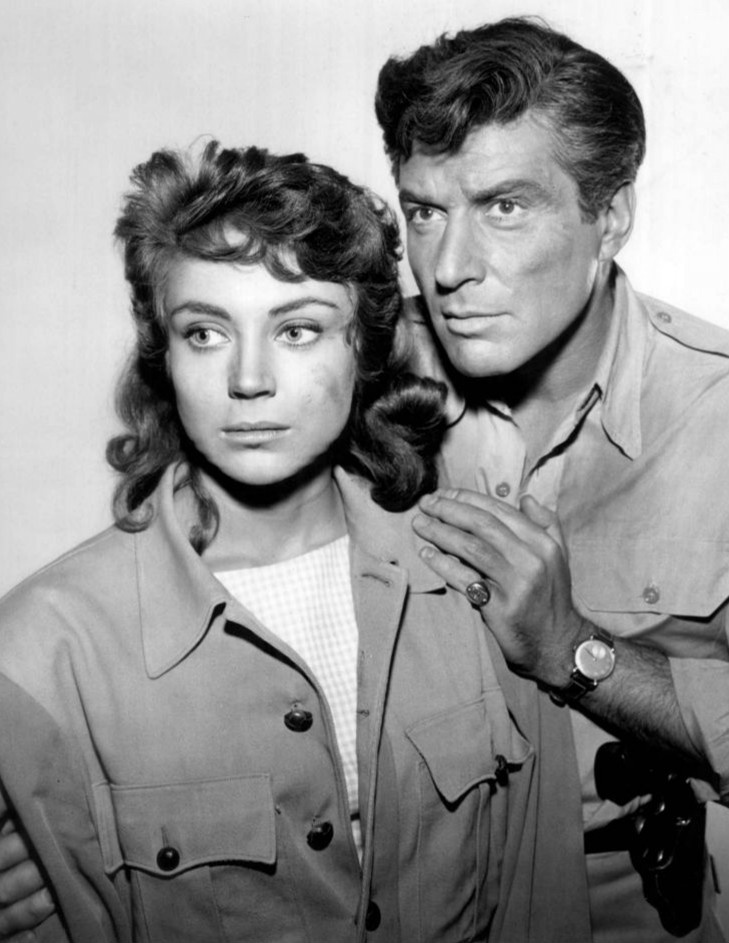
Andra Martin as a guest star on 77 Sunset Strip with Efrem Zimbalist Jr., 1960

An engraving in the Sunset Boulevard sidewalk (address number 8524) between La Cienega Boulevard and Alta Loma Road commemorated 77 Sunset Strip, but the area was slated for redevelopment as part of the Sunset Millennium project. The opposition to the redevelopment of the area was known as "Save Our Strip" or "SOS" and was spearheaded by former 77 Sunset Strip semiregular Gigi Verone. No number 77 exists on the Strip, as all Sunset Boulevard addresses in the area have four digits.

The show was referenced in an episode of Jay Ward's Fractured Flickers, showing a satirical depiction of Ward looking at a lineup of fictional shows, one of them being "77 Gaza Strip."

Episodes of the television series can be seen in reruns through syndication packages offered by Warner Bros. Studios. At one time, 43 episodes had been removed from syndication for various legal reasons, but 13 of these can now be seen as reruns. As of 2017, the syndication package aired on Me-TV contained every original episode.

Thirty-one years after the series left the air, Warner Bros. proposed a modern revival of 77 Sunset Strip, which was to be the first hour-long drama series to air on the new WB Television Network. It was to be produced by Clint Eastwood and starred Jim Caviezel, Timothy Olyphant and Maria Bello. A 25-minute pilot presentation was shot for upfronts in the spring of 1997, but despite a few attempts to modify and finalize it for broadcast in 1997–1998, the project never made it past the testing stage. Early mentions of the show were made in the network's fall affiliate presentation promotion, with the 77 Sunset Strip logo visible in the movie backlot motif.
