= Wahmonie, Nevada =

- Ghost town
- Location within the state of Nevada Wahmonie, Nevada (the United States)
- Coordinates: 36°48′42″N 116°09′36″W
- Country: United States
- State: Nevada
- County: Nye
- Elevation: 5,190 ft (1,582 m)
- Time zone: UTC-8 (Pacific (PST))
  - Summer (DST): UTC-7 (PDT)
- GNIS feature ID: 857495

Wahmonie was a mining town in Nevada. It was established as a gold mining camp in February 1928 and had a population of 500 by March. Peak population was reached that summer, with between 1000 and 1500 residents. Gold was not found in sufficient quantity to sustain the place, and the site was quickly abandoned. The post office was in operation from April 1928 until April 1929. Wahmonie was the last large mining rush in Nevada. The location was also known as Horn Silver Mine.

The site of the town is on the eastern side of Jackass Flats west of Cane Spring, in what is now the Nevada Test Site. The Wahmonie Flats area was used for the Project Pluto nuclear-powered ramjet project.
