= Wild Youth =

Wild Youth may refer to:

- Junge Wilde, a 20th-century art movement in the German-speaking countries and Denmark
- Youth of the Beast, 1963 Japanese yakuza film directed by Seijun Suzuki
- "Wild Youth", a 1977 single from the punk band Generation X
- Naked Youth, also known as Wild Youth, a 1961 American film directed by John F. Schreyer
- Wild Youth (album), a 2016 debut studio album by Steve Angello
- Wild Youth (band), an Irish indie rock band
- Wild Youth (film), a lost 1918 American silent drama film
- The Wild Youth, an EP by Daughter
