= The Lost Missile =

1958 science fiction film

- Theatrical release poster
- Directed by: Lester Wm. Berke
- Screenplay by: John McPartland; Jerome Bixby
- Story by: Lester Wm. Berke
- Produced by: William Berke; Lee Gordon
- Starring: Robert Loggia; Larry Kerr; Ellen Parker; Phillip Pine; Marilee Earle
- Cinematography: Kenneth Peach, A.S.C.
- Edited by: Everett Sutherland
- Music by: Gerald Fried
- Production companies: William Berke Productions, Inc.
- Distributed by: United Artists
- Release date: December 1, 1958 (United States)
- Running time: 70 minutes
- Country: United States
- Language: English

The Lost Missile is a 1958 American science fiction film written by John McPartland and science-fiction writer Jerome Bixby. It was to have been directed by William Berke, who was also the executive producer, but following Berke's sudden death, his son Lester Wm. Berke became the film's director. It stars Robert Loggia in one of his earliest roles.

== Plot ==
The appearance of an unknown "missile-like" object in nearby space leads a European nation (unnamed, but implied to be one of the countries behind the Iron Curtain) to fire a rocket at it. Though the rocket intercepts the unidentified object, the explosion only diverts the missile into an orbit around the Earth. Racing five miles above the earth, tremendous heat from its rocket engine causes widespread devastation of the land below.

Meanwhile, at the Havenbrook Atomic Laboratory (a thinly veiled reference to the Brookhaven National Laboratory) in suburban New York City, Dr. David Loring and his assistant Joan Woods are preparing for their wedding later that day. Though both are in love, David is deeply committed to his work on a hydrogen warhead for the new "Jove" rocket, so much so that it has interfered with previous attempts at a wedding. Leaving work to go ring shopping, David's irritation with time spent on it leads Joan to accuse him of prioritizing work over their relationship, and she calls off the marriage.

With the missile blazing its path of destruction, a radar station on the DEW Line picks up its approach to the North American continent. Though a patrol jet diverted to intercept the missile is destroyed by the intense heat of its drive, the pilot captures a picture of it that is then transmitted to "Conad", Continental Air Defense Command. An alert mobilizes jets from the Royal Canadian Air Force, which are unable to shoot it down and are destroyed in the attempt.

With the missile projected to fly over New York City, the U.S. military orders a full mobilization. The U.S. and Canadian authorities implement civil defense procedures, preparing the cities of New York and Ottawa for the imminent passage of the missile. As Havenbrook is being evacuated, David realizes that he can use the Jove rocket to get through the missile's intense heat to destroy it, using the fission bomb "trigger" from the incomplete hydrogen warhead. While he works to prepare the plutonium for the bomb, the government orders a full evacuation of New York City. Further efforts by conventional forces to destroy the missile prove unsuccessful, and Ottawa is destroyed as it flies overhead.

As David and Joan race the nuclear core to the missile base, they are attacked by a group of young thugs who steal their jeep with the core inside. David and Joan chase after them, only to find the jeep alongside the road and the men dead from radiation poisoning after having opened the lead-lined box with the plutonium core. Knowing that exposure is fatal, David grabs the box and drives the core to the waiting rocket, loading it into the warhead before dying. The rocket is then launched, intercepting the missile over Lake Champlain and destroying it. The final seconds show scenes of New York City streets, including a movie marquee advertising 1951's Two Tickets to Broadway.

== Cast ==
- Robert Loggia as Dr. David Loring
- Larry Kerr as General Barr
- Ellen Parker as Joan Woods
- Phillip Pine as Dr. Joe Freed
- Marilee Earle as Ella Freed
- Fred Engleberg as TV personality
- Kitty Kelly as Ella Freed's mother
- Selmer Jackson as Secretary of State
- Robert Shayne as Air Force General (uncredited)
- Cosmo Sardo as Colonel
- Hari Rhodes as Pianist
- Shirley Shawn as Pianist's co-performer
- J. Anthony Hughes as New York governor
- Robert Busch
- Jack Holland as Harold
- John McNamara as Civil Aeronautics representative
- Mike Steele
- Cecil Elliot as Harold's wife
- Viola Harris
- Don Pethley
- Myron Cook
- Mark Dunhill
- Guest Stars Joe Hyams as Young, a reporter
- Bill Bradley as Bill Bradley, a reporter
- Lawrence Dobkin as the narrator

Note: Character names are not indicated in on-screen credits.

== Production ==
A low-budget film that relied heavily on stock footage of military forces and civil-defense exercises, The Lost Missile carried a Cold War-era message of the importance of the work performed by scientists and the military in protecting the nation from external threats.

The concept of the atomic-powered cruise-missile doomsday weapon was similar to that of the U.S. Air Force's Supersonic Low Altitude Missile, which was under development at the time.

== See also ==
- Rocket Attack U.S.A.
