= Johnny Cool =

1963 film by William Asher

- Theatrical release poster
- Directed by: William Asher
- Written by: Joseph Landon
- Based on: The Kingdom of Johnny Cool by John McPartland
- Starring: Henry Silva; Elizabeth Montgomery; Jim Backus; Joey Bishop; Brad Dexter; Hank Henry; Marc Lawrence; John McGiver; Gregory Morton; Mort Sahl; Telly Savalas; Sammy Davis Jr.
- Cinematography: Sam Leavitt
- Edited by: Otto Ludwig
- Music by: Billy May
- Production companies: Chrislaw Productions; Avernus Productions
- Distributed by: United Artists
- Release dates: August 30, 1963 (Chicago, premiere); October 2, 1963 (U.S.)
- Running time: 103 minutes
- Country: United States
- Language: English
- Budget: $500,000
- Box office: $1,500,000

Johnny Cool is a 1963 American neo-noir gangster film directed and produced by William Asher, starring Henry Silva and Elizabeth Montgomery, and featuring Jim Backus, Joey Bishop, Mort Sahl, Telly Savalas, and Sammy Davis Jr.. The plot is about a young Sicilian criminal (Silva) who is sent to the United States by an exiled American mafioso to exact revenge on his old enemies.

Executive produced by Peter Lawford, the film was based on the 1959 pulp novel The Kingdom of Johnny Cool by John McPartland. The film premiered in Chicago on August 30, 1963, and released in the U.S. by United Artists on October 19.

== Plot ==
Johnny Colini, an exiled American living in Rome, rescues Salvatore Giordano, a young Sicilian outlaw, from the police. After Giordano is groomed, polished, and renamed "Johnny Cool", Colini sends him on a mission of vengeance to the United States to assassinate the men who plotted his downfall and enforced exile. Johnny arrives in New York and quickly kills several of the underworld figures on Colini's list.

Meanwhile, he picks up Darien "Dare" Guinness, a wealthy divorcée who becomes his accomplice, she is later severely beaten by the gangsters as a warning to Johnny against pursuing his vendetta. Soon the FBI becomes involved, and when Johnny and Dare bomb the Hollywood home of gangster Lennart Crandall, the police are able to identify Dare's car when she panics and leaves it parked on the street. The two had separated and planned to meet later, but Dare, abruptly realizing that Johnny is a vicious killer, tells his enemies where to find him. She then surrenders herself to the FBI, as Johnny is being tortured by his captors at the film's conclusion.

== Cast ==
- Henry Silva as Salvatore Giordano / Johnny Cool
- Elizabeth Montgomery as Darien "Dare" Guinness
- Jim Backus as Louis Murphy
- Marc Lawrence as Johnny Colini
- Joey Bishop as Holmes
- Brad Dexter as Lennart Crandall
- Mort Sahl as Ben Morrow
- Hank Henry as Larry
- Telly Savalas as Vincenzo "Vince" Santangelo
- Sammy Davis Jr. as Educated
- Richard Anderson as Correspondent
- Frank Albertson as Bill Blakely
- John McGiver as Oscar B. "Oby" Hinds
- Gregory Morton as Jerry March
- Cosmo Sardo as Peter the Bartender
- Joseph Calleia as Tourist
- Elisha Cook Jr. as Undertaker
- John Dierkes as "Cripple"
- Clegg Hoyt as Craps Player

== Production ==
The film was executive produced by Peter Lawford, better known as an actor and a member of the Rat Pack. Lawford, who made the film through his company Chrislaw Productions, persuaded fellow Rat Pack members Sammy Davis Jr. and Joey Bishop to appear in the film. It was a star vehicle for Henry Silva, who had previously appeared as a supporting in three Rat Pack films — Ocean's 11, Sergeants 3, and the The Manchurian Candidate.

Before Silva was cast, George Chakiris was attached to play the lead, with Edward G. Robinson in the Marc Lawrence role. At one point, Orson Welles was considered for a part.

=== Filming ===
Filming started 17 September 1962. Shooting took place in Los Angeles, Las Vegas, and New York City. A sequence was filmed at the New Frontier Hotel and Casino. Another scene was filmed at Puccini Restaurant in Los Angeles, which was part-owned by Lawford and Frank Sinatra. The 'Sicily' sequences were filmed on Santa Catalina Island and in San Clemente.

Elizabeth Montgomery and William Asher fell in love during filming and got married. They would collaborate on Bewitched.

== Release ==
As a publicity stunt, United Artists invited members of the Cosa Nostra to a special screening.

As a promotional tie-in, The Kingdom of Johnny Cool was republished by Gold Medal Books.

== Reception ==
=== Box office ===
In April 1964 Variety reported the film's box office performance in America was "less than stirring" but it "is drawing some attention abroad. The gangster opus is particularly strong in France." According to Lawford's biographer, the film's box office in the US dropped off sharply after the assassination of John F. Kennedy.

Variety said the film "should please though filmgoers who dote on destruction."

== Soundtrack ==
Johnny Cool

Soundtrack album by Billy May
- Released: 1963
- Recorded: 1963; Hollywood, California
- Genre: Film score
- Length: 31:43
- Labels: United Artists; UAL 4111/UAS 5111

Professional ratings
Review scores
Source	Rating
Allmusic	3/5 stars

The film score was composed, arranged and conducted by Billy May, and the soundtrack album was released on the United Artists label in 1963. Allmusic's Steven McDonald noted "This soundtrack manages to mix the early '60s caper-flick brand of jazz with the darker feel of 1950s film noir – a genre to which Johnny Cool was a deliberate throwback."

=== Track listing ===
All compositions by Billy May except as indicated

1. "The Lizard" – 2:38
2. "Window Washer" – 2:37
3. "Dare's Affair" – 2:40
4. "Borrow a Knife" – 1:47
5. "Johnny Cool Theme" – 2:19
6. "Morning in Balboa" – 2:14
7. "Nice Quiet Saloon" – 2:35
8. "Green Tables Blues" – 3:16
9. "The Coolest Pad" – 3:18
10. "Juan Coolisto" – 2:19
11. "Bee Bom" (Les Vandyke) – 2:14
12. "The Ballad of Johnny Cool" (Jimmy Van Heusen, Sammy Cahn) – 2:58

=== Personnel ===
- Orchestra arranged and conducted by Billy May
- Sammy Davis Jr. – vocals (tracks 11 & 12)
