= The Wild Party (1956 film) =

1956 film by Harry Horner

- Theatrical release poster
- Directed by: Harry Horner
- Screenplay by: John McPartland
- Based on: Step Down to Terror; 1954 story by John McPartland
- Produced by: Sidney Harmon; Philip Yordan
- Starring: Anthony Quinn; Carol Ohmart; Arthur Franz; Jay Robinson; Kathryn Grant; Nehemiah Persoff; Paul Stewart
- Cinematography: Sam Leavitt
- Edited by: Richard C. Meyer
- Music by: Buddy Bregman
- Production company: Security Pictures
- Distributed by: United Artists
- Release date: December 21, 1956
- Running time: 91 minutes
- Country: United States
- Language: English

The Wild Party is a 1956 American film noir crime film directed by Harry Horner and written by John McPartland. The film stars Anthony Quinn, Carol Ohmart, Arthur Franz, Jay Robinson, Kathryn Grant, Nehemiah Persoff, and Paul Stewart. The film was released on December 21, 1956 by United Artists.

== Plot ==
A former football player, "Big Tom" Kupfen, despondent over his glory days being behind him, drinks and uses drugs with a coterie of sycophants that includes a piano player called Kicks Johnson, a drifter named Gage Freeposter and a naive young woman known only as "Honey".

On a whim, the group decides to go after a wealthy socialite, Erica London, and rob her home. They end up taking Erica and her fiancée, naval officer Arthur Mitchell, captive at an amusement park, with dire consequences for all.

== Cast ==
- Anthony Quinn as Tom Kupfen
- Carol Ohmart as Erica London
- Arthur Franz as Lt. Arthur Mitchell
- Jay Robinson as Gage Freeposter
- Kathryn Grant as Honey
- Nehemiah Persoff as Kicks Johnson
- Paul Stewart as Ben Davis
- Nestor Paiva as Branson
- Maureen Stephenson as Ellen
- Michael Ross as Bouncer
- James Bronte as Bartender
- William Phipps as Wino
- Barbara Nichols as Sandy
