= Carol Ohmart =

American actress and model

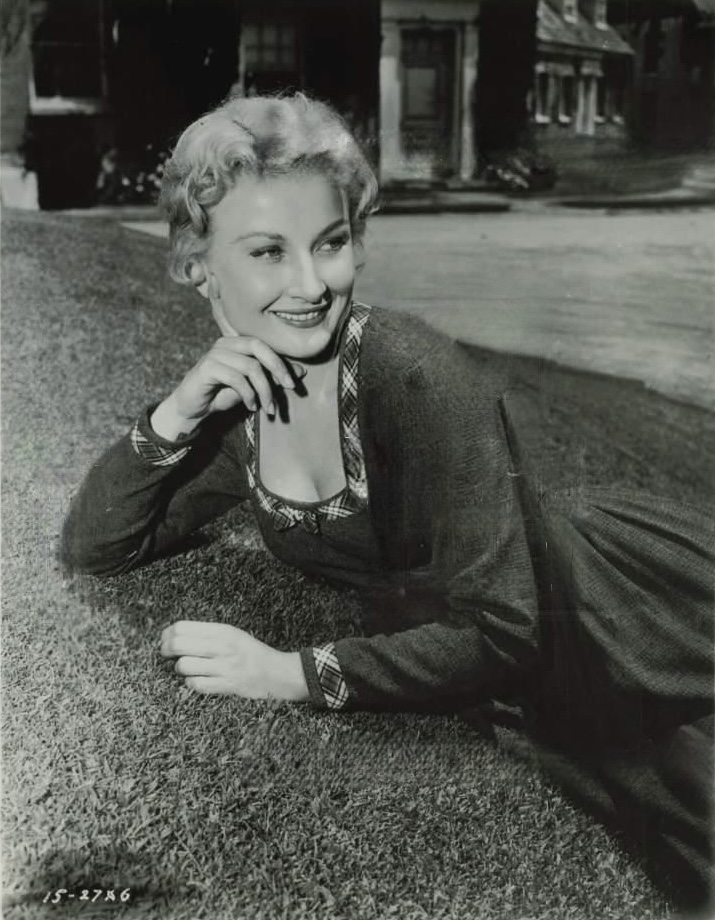
- Ohmart in Northwest Passage, 1958
- Born: Armelia Carol Ohmart; June 3, 1927; Salt Lake City, Utah, U.S.
- Died: January 1, 2002 (aged 74); Fort Collins, Colorado, U.S.
- Occupations: Actress; model
- Years active: 1950 – 1974
- Height: 5 ft 7 in (1.70 m)
- Spouses: Ken Grayson (m. 1949; ann. 1951) Wayde Preston (m. 1956; div. 1958) William Traberth (m. 1978)

Armelia Carol Ohmart (June 3, 1927 – January 1, 2002), known professionally as Carol Ohmart, was an American actress and former model who appeared in numerous films and television series from the early 1950s until the 1970s. Over the duration of her career, she would appear in several notable horror and film noirs, including lead roles in The Wild Party (1956) and William Castle's House on Haunted Hill (1959).

Born to a Mormon family in Salt Lake City, Ohmart spent most of her early life in Seattle and Spokane, Washington. After graduating high school, she returned to Utah where she won the title of Miss Utah, and subsequently placed fourth in the Miss America pageant. Her appearance in pageants led to modeling work, which included posing for artist Milton Caniff.

Ohmart made her feature film debut in Michael Curtiz's The Scarlet Hour in 1956, followed by various television appearances, as well as roles in several horror films, such as House on Haunted Hill (1959) and Spider Baby (1968). Her final film appearance was in The Spectre of Edgar Allan Poe (1974), after which she formally retired from acting, dedicating her time to studying New Age philosophy and spiritualism. Ohmart spent the majority of her later life in Seattle, before dying of natural causes in Fort Collins, Colorado, in 2002, aged 74. In 1955, Michael Curtiz said of her: "She is unusual, superior, quiet, has buried emotion. She is a girl who is searching for something. She is destined to become one of Paramount's outstanding stars."

== Early life ==
Milton Caniff draws Steve Canyon's "Copper Calhoon", with Ohmart as his model (1947)

Milton Caniff with Ohmart, 1947

Ohmart was born Armelia Carol Ohmart on June 3, 1927, in Salt Lake City, Utah, into a Mormon family. Her parents were C. Thomas Ohmart, a dentist who was first a professional actor, and his wife, Armelia Ohmart. Her family relocated to Seattle, Washington, shortly after Ohmart's birth. (Note: Public records for King County, Washington, show Armelia Carol Ohmart, age 2, a resident of Seattle.) At age twelve, Ohmart sang on KFRC in San Francisco, California. She also sang on KSL, KUTA and KDYL in her hometown of Salt Lake City. Additionally, she sang with dance bands, including that of Jan Garber, as a teenager.

She was raised primarily in Washington state, though she briefly attended East High School in Salt Lake City, later graduating from Lewis and Clark High School in Spokane, Washington. After graduating from high school, Ohmart returned to Utah with her mother, and in 1946, won the Miss Utah pageant. She then placed fourth runner-up in the Miss America pageant.

Ohmart's work in pageants led to several modeling jobs in 1947, during which time Ohmart became a model for the character "Copper Calhoun" in Milton Caniff's Steve Canyon comic strip. Ohmart would serve as a model for numerous illustrations for Caniff, and was featured in a 1947 profile in Popular Photography.

== Career ==
=== Television ===
Ohmart was seen on early television doing commercials, appearing on NBC's Bonny Maid Versatile Varieties (1949–51), which aired Friday nights at 9 p.m. Ohmart was seen pitching floor wax along with Anne Francis and Eva Marie Saint, the other two hostesses of the show. She also worked on The 20th Century Fox Hour and Juke Box Jury.

Ohmart moved to New York in 1955 where she worked as an understudy on Broadway. She had steady work in television until the early 1970s, with guest roles in Men into Space, Bat Masterson, Ripcord, The Life and Legend of Wyatt Earp, Get Smart, Perry Mason, Tombstone Territory, and Barnaby Jones.

=== Film ===
Dubbed a "female Brando" by the press, Paramount Pictures signed her in 1955 and promoted her as the next Marilyn Monroe. Ohmart had top billing in The Scarlet Hour, a Paramount film made by the distinguished director Michael Curtiz about a married woman who persuades her lover to commit a jewel robbery. Ohmart recalled of the film: "It was the wrong vehicle to launch me as a star. Frank Tashlin, one of the film's three screenwriters, told me that it had been earlier turned down by Barbara Stanwyck. Foolishly, Paramount let its new leading lady portray a lush, an adulteress wife and a suicide by the film's end." After nearly $2 million spent promoting her, Ohmart was released from her seven-year contract. She co-starred with Anthony Quinn in a 1956 crime drama, The Wild Party.

After marrying Wayde Preston, she briefly retired from acting, only to return a year later in films and television. Producer Jack Warner offered her a supporting role in Born Reckless (1958). Although she did not like the script, she took the role. One of her most noted roles was in William Castle's House on Haunted Hill (1959), playing a murderous wife. In 1962, she returned to New York City to appear in an off-Broadway production titled Banderol. This was followed by a supporting part in the Denis Sanders-directed One Man's Way (1964). Omhart starred in Wild Youth (1961) with John Goddard and Steve Rowland. Goddard said of Ohmart, "She was very talented and unassuming. I remember that Steve and I played a joke on her where we put a mannequin in her room. She screamed and ran out of the room after seeing it. She took it with a sense of humor though."

Ohmart took a hiatus from appearing in films for several years, selling real estate and becoming involved in studying spiritualism, and ended up in debt. In 1967, she appeared in the exploitation film Caxambu!, followed by a lead role in the cult horror film Spider Baby; according to director Jack Hill, Ohmart was enthusiastic about the project, asking, "Do you think we can win an Academy Award for this?" He also said, "...she was suggested as somebody who had a little bit of a sort of familiar name, who might be available because she wasn't doing anything." Her last film role was in 1974's The Spectre of Edgar Allan Poe.

== Personal life ==
Ohmart married three times, most notably to actor Wayde Preston. They wed in 1956, and were divorced in 1958. Her first marriage, in 1949, was to actor Ken Grayson; it was annulled in 1951. In 1978, she married William Traberth in Wyoming, a veteran and former firefighter, and retired in Sequim, Washington, a suburb of Seattle. She changed her name to Kariomar S. Traberth, taking her husband's surname, and was guarded about her private life.

Throughout the late 1960s and 1970s, Ohmart dedicated much of her time to studying spiritualism and New Age philosophy, which served as a basis for various poems and short stories she wrote. Her poetry was compiled in a manuscript titled Song of Salt. Around 1973, while filming an episode of Barnaby Jones in Los Angeles, Ohmart was attacked and beaten by three men on a street in Hollywood. After being discharged from the hospital over her injuries, Ohmart was prescribed pain killers, which marked the beginnings of a years-long addiction to prescription medication.

In 1989, Ohmart agreed to be the subject of an extensive profile in the Los Angeles Times. In the profile, Ohmart revealed that she had an estranged relationship with her mother, who did not know of her daughter's whereabouts for the last ten years of her life, up until her death in 1987. Ohmart recalled:

Until I became of legal age, I was terrorized. It was hammered into me that God's command was to love your mother or God will kill you... I forgave her, but I haven't forgotten. How could I? I tried to be a dutiful daughter, I wrote her all those (hundreds of) letters, but she never let me live my own life. She tried to live through me. I appreciated her supporting me during the lean years, but she wasn't doing it for me, it was for her own selfish ends, to keep me taking orders. She controlled my life.

== Death ==
Ohmart died in Fort Collins, Colorado, on January 1, 2002, aged 74, of natural causes. She was cremated. Her ashes were scattered over Carter Lake in Loveland, Colorado. Her death wasn't publicly announced until July 2015. Her death certificate listed her as Kari Omar Sonne Traberth.

== Legacy ==
Ohmart has been regarded as a talented actress, being referred to as "a female Brando" in reference to Marlon Brando by writer James Bacon of the Associated Press. In discussing The Scarlet Hour, David Bongard of the Herald Express wrote that "Carol Ohmart is the sultry boss's wife. She has an amazing physical resemblance, in some angles, to Barbara Stanwyck. Obviously she's Curtiz's Galatea in the acting field. If the material weren't so childish and over-dramatic, she might have made a bull's-eye with this. She soon might be capable of the stuff of a Stanwyck or a Bette Davis."

The New York Times referred to her performance in One Man's Way as "quite effective".

In reviewing Spider Baby, David Cairns stated that "Carol Ohmart excels as the nasty heiress, intent on kicking the freaks out of their decaying mansion."

== Filmography ==
Year	Title	Role	Notes
1956	The Scarlet Hour	Pauline "Paulie" Nevins	
1956	The Wild Party	Erica London	
1958	Born Reckless	Liz	
1959	House on Haunted Hill	Annabelle Loren	
1959	The Scavengers	Marion Allison	
1960	Wild Youth	Madge	Also known as: Naked Youth
1962	The Red Uncle		Short film
1964	One Man's Way	Evelyn Grace	
1967	Spider Baby	Emily Howe	
1967	Caxambu!	Peggy Garrat	
1974	The Spectre of Edgar Allan Poe	Lisa Grimaldi	

== Works cited ==
- Jorgensen, Jay (2010). Edith Head: The Fifty-Year Career of Hollywood's Greatest Costume Designer. Running Press. ISBN 978-0-762-44173-0.
- Maltin, Leonard (1994). Leonard Maltin's Movie and Video Guide. Plume. ISBN 978-0-452-27327-6.
