= Eleanore Griffin =

American screenwriter

- Born: Eleanore Mary Griffin; April 29, 1904; Saint Paul, Minnesota, USA
- Died: July 26, 1995 (aged 91); Woodland Hills, California, USA
- Occupation: Screenwriter

Eleanore Griffin (April 29, 1904 – July 26, 1995) was an American screenwriter who worked in Hollywood. She is best known for co-writing the film Boys Town, which she won an Oscar for in 1938. Griffin worked on and wrote for over 20 different Hollywood films between 1937 and 1964.

== Personal life ==
Griffin was born in St. Paul, Minnesota, in 1904, the daughter of Patrick Griffin (and Irish immigrant) and Nellie Shine.

While in Hollywood, Griffin struggled at times with alcoholism, which resulted in a break from her work from 1948 until 1955.

Griffin was romantically involved with fellow studio writer William Rankin. The two were meant to be wed in 1937 in Tijuana, Mexico, but because of technicalities in Mexican law were never officially married. This fact was revealed to them when they sought out a divorce the following year in 1938. The two continued a professional relationship, working together on six different scripts.

Griffin died at the age of 91 at the Motion Picture and Television Fund Hospital in Woodland Hills, California.

== Career ==
Griffin got into writing as a journalist in the 1920s. She started in Hollywood at the age of 33 when she began writing for different studios and wrote the story for the film Time out for Romance (1937). Her first job in Hollywood was working at Universal writing short stories, or treatments, which if accepted would later be turned into a screenplay.

After her start in 1937, Griffin would go on to write for more than 30 years in Hollywood. In those 30 years, she worked for a number of different studios, such as MGM, Disney, Fox, and Paramount. Her screenplays and stories were the basis for many famous directors of the time, such as Douglas Sirk and George Sidney.

In 1938, Griffin won her first and only Oscar for co-writing the story for the film Boys Town. The film, directed by Norman Taurog, is based on the real-life priest Father Edward J. Flanagan, who tried to help a group of underprivileged boys through a home that he founded called Boys Town. In 1994, Newt Gingrich, speaker of the House of Representatives, referenced the film to argue that philanthropists would help people who were affected by government cuts.

Several films written by Griffin deal with characters who are religious figures. This includes her Oscar-winning film Boys Town, with the character of Father Flanagan, as well as A Man Called Peter, with the character of Peter Marshall, a Presbyterian minister, and Reverend Norman Vincent Peale in One Man’s Way.

== Filmography ==
=== Films ===
Year	Title	Credits
1937	Time Out for Romance	Story
1937	When Love Is Young	Story
1937	Love in a Bungalow	Story
1937	Thoroughbreds Don't Cry	Original Story
1938	Boys Town	Original Story
1939	St. Louis Blues	Original Story
1939	Street of Missing Men	Story
1941	I Wanted Wings	Story
1941	Blondie in Society	Story
1943	In Old Oklahoma	Screenplay
1944	Hi, Beautiful	Story
1945	Nob Hill	Story
1946	The Harvey Girls	Original Story
1948	Tenth Avenue Angel	Writer
1955	A Man Called Peter	Screenplay
1955	Good Morning, Miss Dove	Screenplay
1959	Imitation of Life	Screenplay
1959	Third Man on the Mountain	Screenplay
1961	Back Street	Screenplay
1964	One Man's Way	Writer

=== Television ===
Year	Show	Episodes	Credits
1955	Fireside Theatre	"The Blessing of Pets" (Season 2, Episode 32)	Original Story
1956	Climax!	"An Episode of Sparrows" (Season 2 Episode 25)	Writer
1963	Walt Disney's Wonderful World of Color	"Banner in the Sky: To Conquer the Mountain", "Banner in the Sky: The Killer Mountain" (Season 9, Episodes 20 & 21)	Writer
