= Nob Hill (film) =

1945 film by Henry Hathaway

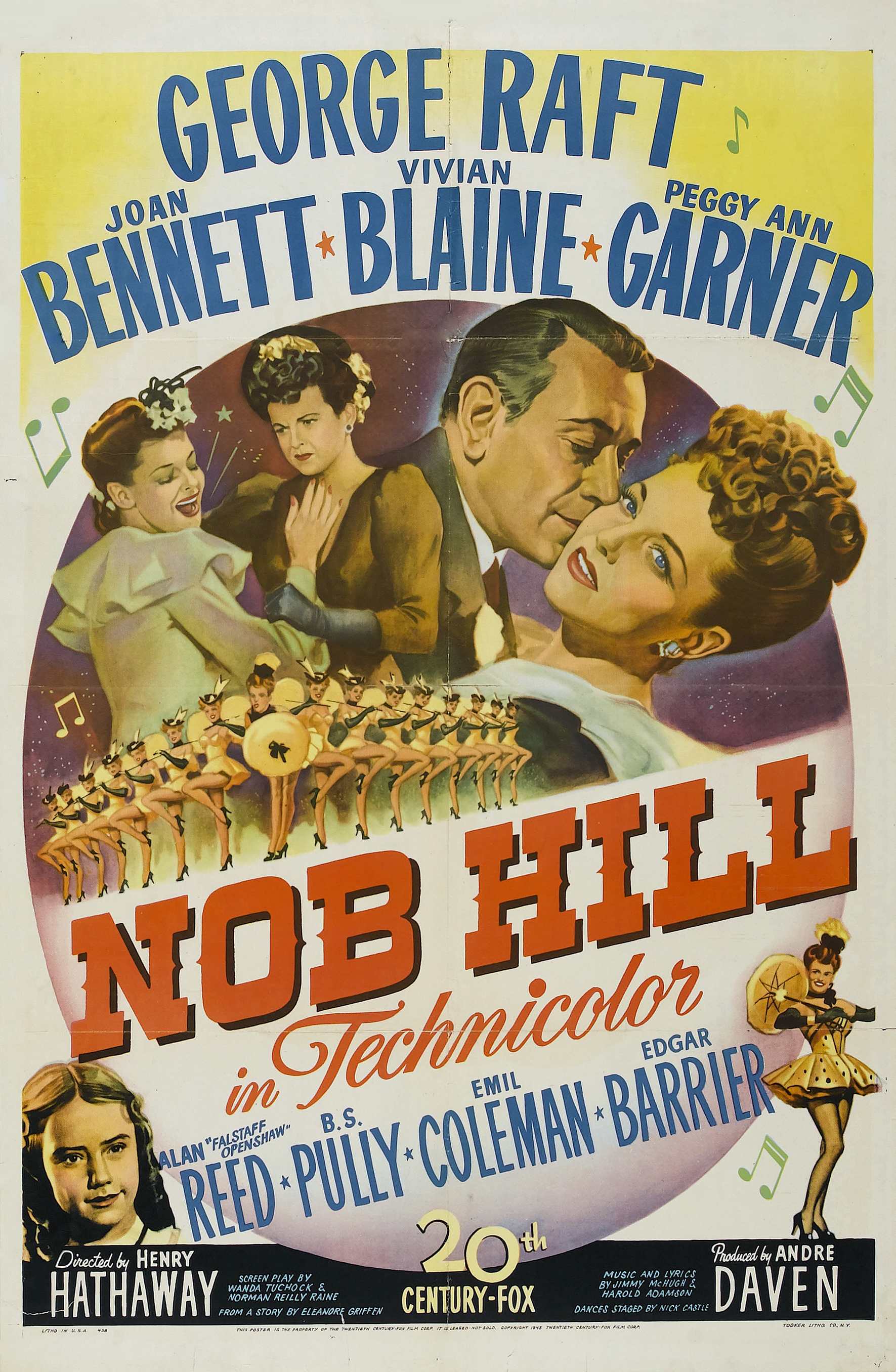
- Directed by: Henry Hathaway
- Screenplay by: Norman Reilly Raine; Wanda Tuchock
- Based on: Crocus Hill by Eleanore Griffin
- Produced by: André Daven
- Starring: George Raft; Joan Bennett; Vivian Blaine; Peggy Ann Garner
- Cinematography: Edward Cronjager
- Edited by: Harmon Jones
- Music by: Score: David Buttolph; Songs: Jimmy McHugh (music); Harold Adamson (lyrics)
- Distributed by: Twentieth Century-Fox Film Corporation
- Release date: June 13, 1945 (U.S.)
- Running time: 95 min.
- Country: United States
- Language: English
- Box office: $3,104,000 or $2,300,000

Nob Hill is a 1945 Technicolor musical film about a Barbary Coast, San Francisco, United States saloon keeper, starring George Raft and Joan Bennett. Part musical and part drama, the movie was directed by Henry Hathaway. It remains one of Raft's lesser known movies even though it was a big success, in part because it was a musical.

== Plot ==
Sally Templeton sings at Tony Angelo's popular turn-of-the-century nightclub in San Francisco, which is called the Gold Coast. She is also in love with Tony.

One day, a young girl, Katie Flanagan, just off the boat from Ireland, arrives looking for her uncle. Informed that he has died, Katie is about to be sent back by Tony on the next ship until Sally persuades him to let the girl stay awhile.

Tony falls for Nob Hill socialite Harriet Carruthers and agrees to support her brother, Lash, who is a candidate for district attorney. Business acquaintances are upset because Lash might shut down clubs like theirs if elected DA. Sally objects to the attention he is paying Harriet and takes a job singing in another club. Katie misses her terribly.

After the election, Tony discovers that Harriet has no interest in a future with someone like him. He grows despondent and turns to drink. Sally reconciles with Tony, who is also heartened by Lash's acknowledgment that he intends to investigate only law-breaking operations, not Tony's, which is respectable. All is well until Katie runs away, but after a desperate search in Chinatown for the child, Tony and Sally finally find her.

== Cast ==
- George Raft as Tony Angelo
- Joan Bennett as Harriet Carruthers
- Vivian Blaine as Sally Templeton
- Peggy Ann Garner as Katie Flanagan
- Alan Reed as Dapper Jack Harrigan
- B.S. Pully as Joe the Bartender
- Edgar Barrier as Lash Carruthers

== Production ==
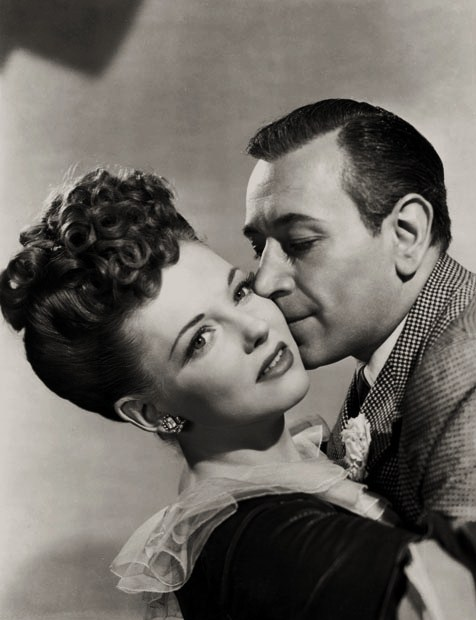
Raft and Blaine

In March 1943, producer Harry Sherman announced he had purchased an original screen story, Crocus Hill by Eleanore Griffin, about a ten-year-old Irish girl in 1860s San Francisco; she arrives to discover her uncle is dead and gets adopted by a gambler because she is good luck. Sherman was going to change the title to Nob Hill and film it for United Artists the following year.

20th Century Fox had a lot of success making Technicolor musicals set during America's past, including Coney Island (1943) and Hello, Frisco, Hello (1943). Most were set in a saloon and revolved around a love triangle. In October 1943 Fox announced they had purchased Sherman's interest in Nob Hill. Norman Reilly Raine was going to write the script, Andre Daven would produce and the film would be a vehicle for Peggy Ann Garner, who had just impressed in Jane Eyre. The original adult stars were to be Michael O'Shea and Jeanne Crain. Eventually the male starring role was assigned to Fred MacMurray with Gregory Ratoff to direct and Lynn Bari and Merle Oberon to be the female leads along with Garner.

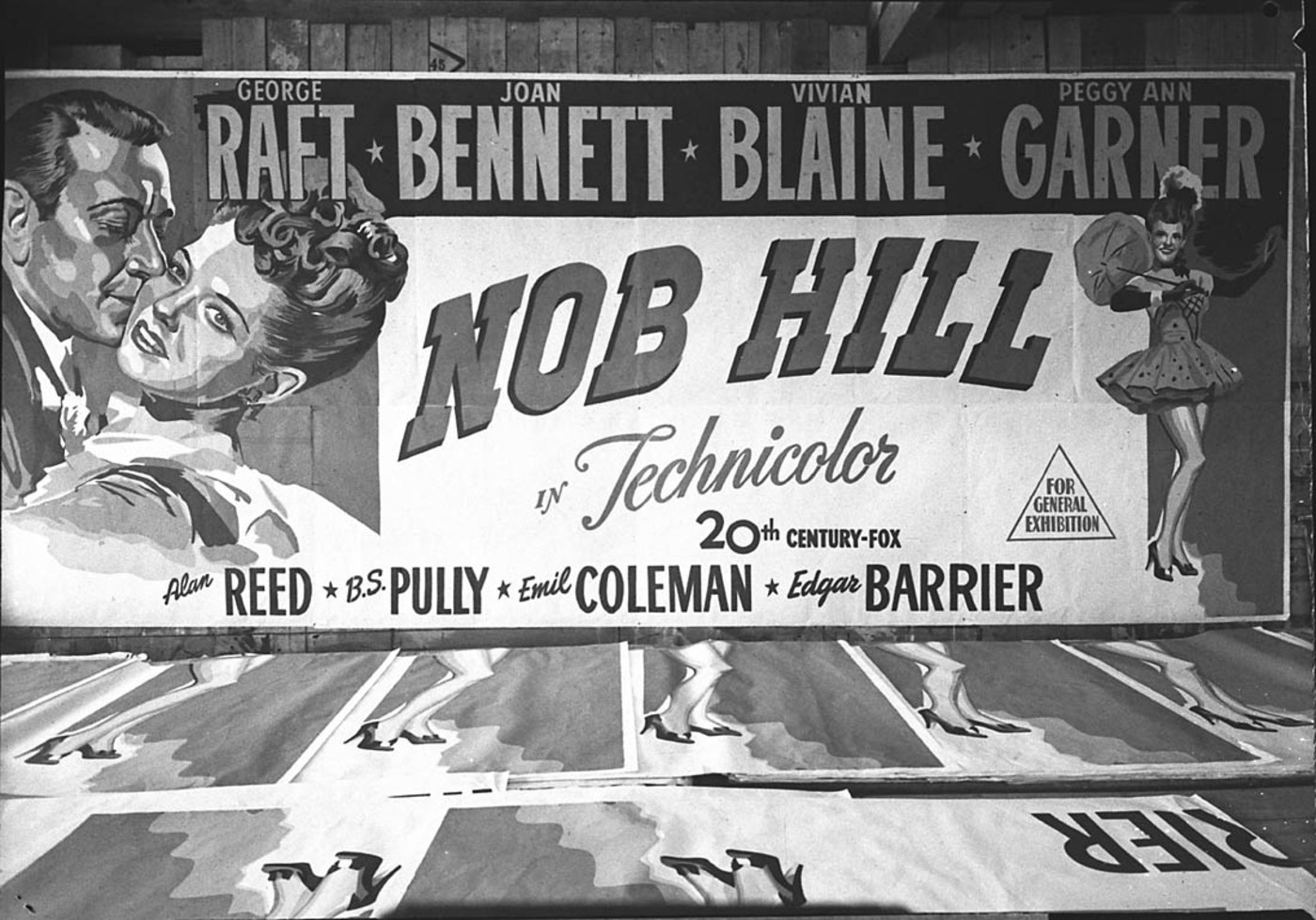
Release poster

In May 1944 Ratoff dropped out and Darryl F. Zanuck offered the film to Henry Hathaway, who turned it down because he was uncomfortable with directing a musical. Zanuck put Hathaway on suspension, and Hathaway agreed to make the film. Zanuck allowed Hathaway to make some key changes, including reducing the amount of musical interludes, and removing a sequence that made fun of a Chinese servant. (Hathaway later claimed Nob Hill was the only film "a studio ever handed me that I said I didn't want to make and I made it anyway.")

Fred MacMurray proved unavailable due to delays on Murder, He Says and was replaced by George Raft. Raft had previously made a successful film set during this period for Zanuck, The Bowery (1933). MacMurray instead went into Where Do We Go From Here?. Bari was then put in Where Do We Go From Here and Oberon dropped out; the female leads would be Vivian Blaine and Joan Bennett. Filming started in July 1944.

== Reception ==
=== Box office ===
The film was one of the most popular releases at the US box office in 1945.

=== Critical ===
Bosley Crowther of the New York Times said the film was essentially a remake of Hello, Frisco, Hello, which was a remake of Alexander's Ragtime Band, adding that "What's to be said about such wish-wash that hasn't been said before? Shall we say that the songs are presentable and that Vivian Blaine presents them all right? Shall we say that George Raft is rather silly... that Joan Bennett is even sillier... and that Peggy Ann Garner is badly wasted...? Or shall we just say that everything in it, including the whiskey (which flows freely), is corn—only this corn, unlike the whiskey, does not improve with age?"
