= One Man's Way =

1963 film by Denis Sanders

- Theatrical release poster
- Directed by: Denis Sanders
- Screenplay by: John W. Bloch; Eleanore Griffin
- Produced by: Frank Ross
- Starring: Don Murray; Diana Hyland; William Windom; Virginia Christine; Carol Ohmart; Veronica Cartwright
- Cinematography: Ernest Laszlo
- Edited by: Philip W. Anderson
- Music by: Richard Markowitz
- Production company: Frank Ross Productions
- Distributed by: United Artists
- Release date: December 23, 1963
- Running time: 105 minutes
- Country: United States
- Language: English

One Man's Way is a 1963 American drama film directed by Denis Sanders and written by John W. Bloch and Eleanore Griffin. The film stars Don Murray as the preacher and author Norman Vincent Peale. The cast also includes Diana Hyland, William Windom, Virginia Christine, Carol Ohmart and Veronica Cartwright.

The film was released on December 23, 1963, by United Artists.

== Plot ==
As a young man, Norman Vincent Peale is working in Detroit as a crime reporter for a newspaper. Saddened by the tragedies he witnesses or writes about, Peale enters a seminary. He moves to New York City, becoming a minister and writing a best-selling book, The Power of Positive Thinking, that also becomes controversial. After a considerable amount of soul-searching that leads him to the brink of leaving his vocation, Peale decides to continue with his work.

== Cast ==
- Don Murray as Norman Vincent Peale
- Diana Hyland as Ruth Stafford Peale
- William Windom as Reverend Clifford Peale
- Virginia Christine as Anna Peale
- Carol Ohmart as Evelyn Grace
- Veronica Cartwright as Mary
- Liam Sullivan as Dr. Arthur Gordon
- June Dayton as Mrs. Gordon
- Ian Wolfe as Bishop Hardwick
- Charles Lampkin as Lafe
- Arthur Peterson, Jr. as Instructor
- Hope Summers as Mrs. Elwood Thompson
- Virginia Sale as Miss S.E. Collingswood
- Ed Peck as Harry the Reporter
- Butch Patrick as John Peale
- Tom Skerritt as Grown Leonard Peale
- Bing Russell as Tom Rayburn

== Critical reception ==
In the New York Times, film critic Howard Thompson wrote, "As a biographical tribute to one of America's best-known Protestant clergymen, the picture is thoughtful and genteel," adding that it is "a worthy movie" that "sustains an unpretentious tone from start to finish."

== See also ==
- List of American films of 1963
