= The Scarlet Hour =

1956 film by Michael Curtiz

- Theatrical release poster
- Directed by: Michael Curtiz
- Screenplay by: Alford Van Ronkel; Frank Tashlin; John Meredyth Lucas
- Story by: Alford Van Ronkel; Frank Tashlin
- Produced by: Michael Curtiz
- Starring: Carol Ohmart; Tom Tryon; Jody Lawrance
- Cinematography: Lionel Lindon
- Edited by: Everett Douglas
- Music by: Leith Stevens
- Color process: Black and white
- Production company: Michael Curtiz Productions
- Distributed by: Paramount Pictures
- Release date: April 5, 1956
- Running time: 95 minutes
- Country: United States
- Language: English
- Budget: $700,000

The Scarlet Hour is a 1956 American film noir crime film directed and produced by Michael Curtiz, and starring Carol Ohmart, Tom Tryon, and Jody Lawrance. It was distributed by Paramount Pictures. Curtiz had previously directed such noted films as Casablanca, Yankee Doodle Dandy, and White Christmas. The screenplay was based on the story "The Kiss Off" by Frank Tashlin. The song "Never Let Me Go", written by Jay Livingston and Ray Evans, is performed by Nat King Cole. UCLA has an original 16 mm copy of the film in its Film and Television Archive.

The initial filming began on June 6, 1955.

A 35mm studio archive print was screened at the Noir City festival in Seattle in February 2019. It was released on Blu-ray in 2022 by Imprint Films.

== Plot ==
E. V. Marshall, known to all as "Marsh," works for wealthy real-estate businessman Ralph Nevins and is having a romantic affair with Ralph's unhappy wife, Paulie. He asks her to get a divorce, but Paulie grew up impoverished and refuses to do without her husband's money.

One night they overhear thieves planning a jewelry robbery of the home of a doctor named Lynbury. They do not go to the police, concerned that Ralph might learn they were together. When she returns home later, however, Paulie is physically assaulted by her husband, who has deduced she is having an affair, with Marsh.

Ralph tells his secretary Kathy Stevens that he's planning to take his wife on a vacation and permit Marsh to run the company in his absence. Ralph then follows Paulie when she sees Marsh. Now willing to do anything to get away from her husband, Paulie pleads with Marsh to rob the jewels from the thieves as they leave Dr. Lynbury's house.

At the scene of the crime, while Marsh is successfully stealing the gems from the thieves who have robbed Dr. Lynbury, Ralph arrives and begins to rough up Paulie, who has been waiting in a car for Marsh. Paulie shoots Ralph. Gunfire from the thieves and the ensuing confusion makes Marsh believe they were the ones who killed Ralph.

As the police investigate, Kathy discovers that Ralph has secretly made a recording, explaining his suspicions about his wife. Kathy is in love with Marsh, who decides to go to the police and confess. It turns out, meanwhile, that Dr. Lynbury has masterminded the burglary of his own home, looking to collect insurance money after having replaced his wife's jewels with worthless fakes. Police eventually place Lynbury under arrest and Paulie as well, with Marsh's cooperation.

== Cast ==
- Carol Ohmart as Pauline "Paulie" Nevins
- Tom Tryon as E. V. "Marsh" Marshal
- Jody Lawrance as Kathy Stevens
- James Gregory as Ralph Nevins
- Elaine Stritch as Phyllis Rycker
- E. G. Marshall as Lt. Jennings
- Edward Binns as Sgt. Allen
- David Lewis as Dr. Sam Lynbury
- Billy Gray as Tom Rycker
- Jacques Aubuchon as Fat Boy
- Scott Marlowe as Vince
- Johnstone White as Tom Raymond
- James Stone as Dean Franklin (as James F. Stone)
- Maureen Hurley as Mrs. Lynbury
- James Todd as Inspector Paley
- Nat "King" Cole as Night-Club Vocalist (singing "Never Let Me Go")
- Theron Jackson as the car wash attendant
- Richard Deacon (actor) as Mr. Elman, the jeweler
- Benson Fong as Benson, bartender

== Production ==
Lauren Bacall was initially cast as Pauline Nevins, but later left the production. Barbara Stanwyck was then cast, before leaving to do another film. The studio then tested Carol Ohmart and Carroll Baker, to focus on building up their recently signed newcomers. Jack Palance was considered for the role of Marsh, before Tom Tryon was chosen. The role of Kathy Stevens went to Elizabeth Montgomery, but her father's demands with the studio got her dismissed from the production. Michael Curtiz then saw Jody Lawrance on an episode of Fireside Theater, and offered her the role. James Gregory and Elaine Stritch, having left the successful Broadway productions Desperate Hours and Bus Stop, were cast as Ralph and Phyllis. Initially, Wendell Corey and James Todd were considered for the role of Ralph.

The wardrobe was designed by Edith Head, who remarked that Carol Ohmart "looked and moved like a cat".

Although filming was completed within weeks, the release of the film was delayed by several months, after worries that a last-minute name change from Too Late My Love to The Scarlet Hour could cause losses at the box office, since the film had been advertised as Too Late My Love. The advertising and re-advertising after changing the name of the film resulted in costs at roughly $2 million. Kiss-Off and The Kiss-Off were working titles as well.

== Reception ==
The film received mixed reviews from critics. The Times wrote, "It is a very drab hour and a half, in the company of actors who have not yet established their reputations and are unlikely to achieve them as a result of this movie. The story combines a rather unsavory triangle with a jewel robbery and the director Mr. Curtiz has achieved a certain amount of suspense but little else."

David Bongard of the Herald Express wrote that "Carol Ohmart is the sultry boss's wife. She has an amazing physical resemblance, in some angles, to Barbara Stanwyck. Obviously she's Curtiz's Galatea in the acting field. If the material weren't so childish and over-dramatic, she might have made a bull's-eye with this. She soon might be capable of the stuff of a Stanwyck or a Bette Davis."

Critic Leonard Maltin gave the film a lukewarm review, referring to it as a "sluggish study of marital discord leading to murder."

In an interview with New York magazine, Elaine Stritch referred to it as being her worst film, primarily due to her limited role; she said, "The part was so terrible it looked like I was visiting the set: I had nothing to say. I just kept running into places saying, 'Hi!' The worst." In People magazine, she was quoted as saying "The first film I did The Scarlet Hour was shown in a Greenwich Village art house as a laughable exercise in how not to make a movie."

David Krauss of High-Def Digest wrote that "The Scarlet Hour travels a well-worn film noir path, but slick direction from Michael Curtiz, spirited performances from a fascinating cast, and a jaw-dropping transfer freshen up this taut tale of infidelity, greed, and murder. Excellent audio and a first-rate commentary track also distinguish Imprint's release of this little-known but surprisingly potent movie. Though a far cry from Double Indemnity and Out of the Past, The Scarlet Hour delivers solid entertainment and makes a great addition to any noir collection."
