= No Down Payment =

1957 film by Martin Ritt

- Theatrical release poster
- Directed by: Martin Ritt
- Screenplay by: Philip Yordan; Ben Maddow (uncredited)
- Based on: No Down Payment by John McPartland
- Produced by: Jerry Wald
- Starring: Joanne Woodward; Sheree North; Tony Randall; Jeffrey Hunter; Cameron Mitchell; Patricia Owens; Barbara Rush; Pat Hingle
- Cinematography: Joseph LaShelle
- Edited by: Louis R. Loeffler
- Music by: Leigh Harline
- Distributed by: 20th Century Fox
- Release date: October 30, 1957
- Running time: 105 minutes
- Country: United States
- Language: English
- Budget: $995,000 or $700,000
- Box office: $1.2 million (US rentals) or $925,000 (US)

No Down Payment is a 1957 American drama film directed by Martin Ritt. It was written by Philip Yordan, who fronted for an uncredited and blacklisted Ben Maddow, and is based on the novel of the same name by John McPartland. The film stars Joanne Woodward, Sheree North, Tony Randall, Jeffrey Hunter, Cameron Mitchell, Patricia Owens, Barbara Rush, and Pat Hingle.

Set in a California subdivision, the story follows four neighbor couples facing problems such as alcoholism, racism and promiscuity. It received two BAFTA nominations for Best Film From Any Source and Best Foreign Actress (Joanne Woodward).

== Plot ==
New to the city's Sunrise Hills subdivision, electrical engineer David Martin and wife Jean are welcomed by their neighbors. They include appliance store manager Herman Kreitzer, auto mechanic Troy Boone and car salesman Jerry Flagg, and their respective wives.

Leola, the unhappy and restless wife of Troy, wants to have a child. A veteran who still clings to his achievements during the war, Troy has applied for the position of police chief. He refuses to discuss children until the job is his.

Frequently drunk Jerry awkwardly makes passes at the other men's wives, humiliating his own spouse, Isabelle. He also is heavily in debt, spending far too much on things he cannot afford, and often comes up with 'make it big' ideas. He pressures a family to buy a car beyond their means, endangering his job.

David also has money problems. Jean strongly urges him to go into sales, a more lucrative field. But he is a skilled engineer who prefers to stick with what he knows best.

Herman has a valued employee, Iko, who wants to move into Sunrise Hills with his wife and live the suburban life like anybody else. But the racial bias of the time is obvious and Herman's wife dislikes the idea of risking the wrath of neighbors by giving Iko a reference.

Also the city council's president, Herman must inform Troy that he cannot be police chief due to his lack of education. The volatile Troy gets drunk and sexually assaults David's wife Jean, then beats up David when confronted by the angry husband. During an altercation with Leola, after which she decides to leave, Troy is accidentally pinned under his car, and by the time it is lifted from him, he is dying in his wife's arms.

Leola drives out of town as the others reassess their lives.

== Cast ==
- Joanne Woodward as Leola Boone
- Sheree North as Isabelle Flagg
- Tony Randall as Jerry Flagg
- Jeffrey Hunter as David Martin
- Cameron Mitchell as Troy Boone
- Patricia Owens as Jean Martin
- Barbara Rush as Betty Kreitzer
- Pat Hingle as Herman Kreitzer
- Robert Harris as Markham
- Aki Aleong as Iko

== Production ==
Writer Philip Yordan said both the film and the novel on which it was based was his idea. He said he read an article in Life magazine "about the building of these new subdivisions where there are no alleys, no separation, no neighborhood, no community. I had an idea about a no-down-payment subdivision of four houses." Yordan called paperback author John McPartland and paid him $7500 to write a novel based on Yordan's story, with Yordan keeping the film rights. Yordan then arranged for a publisher for the novel and estimated McPartland made $35,000 on the book.

Yordan sold the film rights to Fox and wrote the script. He said he wrote "a sex picture with the economics in there" but Martin Ritt "didn’t like all of the sex stuff in it. He was only interested in the economics." This meant Yordan "had to cut out all but just a little sex." According to Walter Bernstein, "No one knew that the script, attributed to Philip Yordan, had actually been written by Ben Maddow. Even Marty did not know."

Robert Stack was offered the part of Troy Boone but turned it down because he disliked the character.

Filming started April 1957. McPartland died in September 1958.

== Reception ==
=== Box office ===
Yordan said that when the film was finished, Fox head Spyros Skouras felt the movie was "a leftist picture" and as a result "killed the picture."

Variety reported in January 1958 the film earned $1.2 million in North American rentals. By October 1958 the film earned between $2,500,000 and $3,000,000 worldwide. Wald claimed the film would only break even.

=== Critical ===
Variety wrote that Ritt "has done his best to deal realistically with the assorted characters from" the novel but "the flaws of the book are, to a degree, aggravated in the picture and the revamping of the ending - almost everyone ends up going to church — adds an incongruous contrivance. Yet, the picture makes its point, and in-between the dramatics there is a glimmering of the predicament of the new mortgaged middle-class."

Filmink called the movie "classy".

== Impact ==
David Bowie, upon receiving his first fan letter from America in 1967, wrote the fan back and mentioned this film: "I hope one day to get to America. My manager tells me lots about it as he has been there many times with other acts he manages. I was watching an old film on TV the other night called No Down Payment a great film, but rather depressing if it is a true reflection of The American Way Of Life."
