= Maureen Leeds =

Canadian film and television actress

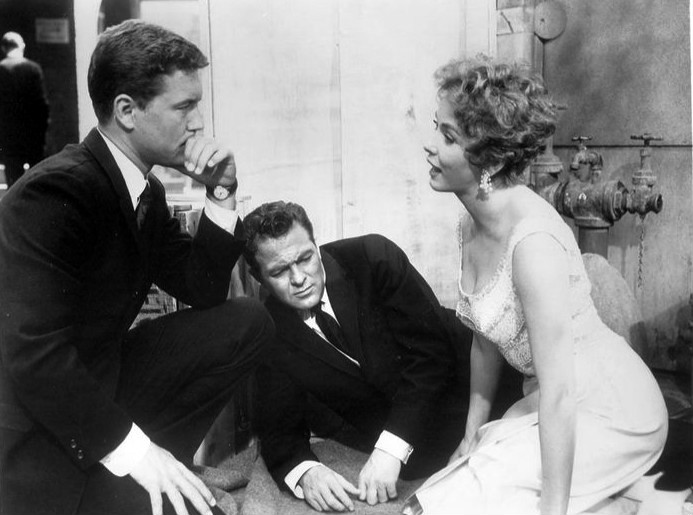
- Leeds (right) with Roger Smith and Biff Elliot in 77 Sunset Strip, 1961
- Born: Maureen Rose Harrington-Caobach; June 26, 1924; Canada
- Died: October 25, 1991 (aged 67)
- Occupations: Film and television actress

Maureen Rose Harrington-Caobach (June 26, 1924 – October 25, 1991) was a Canadian film and television actress.

== Life and career ==
Leeds was born in Canada. She began her screen career in 1953, appearing in the NBC comedy-musical variety series The Colgate Comedy Hour. In the same year, she appeared in the film The French Line.

Later in her career, Leeds guest-starred in television programs including Johnny Ringo, 77 Sunset Strip, Death Valley Days, The Loretta Young Show, Mr. Lucky, Bachelor Father, The Man and the Challenge, Adam-12 and Cheyenne. In 1956, she played Ellen in the film The Wild Party. She also appeared in films such as Son of Sinbad and Dangerous Mission.

Leeds retired from acting in 1972, last appearing in the CBS detective television series Mannix.

== Death ==
Leeds died on October 25, 1991, at the age of 67.
