= John McPartland =

American novelist (1911–1958)

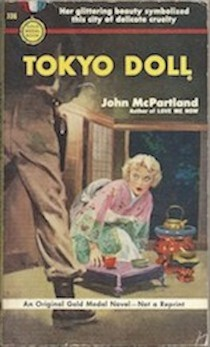
Cover of John McPartland's Tokyo Doll (1958)

John Donald McPartland (1911–1958) was a writer specializing in pulp fiction crime whose career was ended by his death at age 47. In addition to his pulp work, he is known for his more standard novel, No Down Payment, which was later made into the movie of the same name, directed by Martin Ritt and starring Joanne Woodward and Tony Randall, among others.

McPartland also is known for a strongly anti-communist Life magazine article, titled "Portrait of an American Communist", which he penned as a Life magazine staff writer in January 1948.

== Biography ==
McPartland was born April 13, 1911, in Chicago. He was educated as an engineer. In 1943, during World War II, he was inducted into the U.S. Army. After the war, his first book, Sex in Our Changing World, was published in 1947 to moderate success, and he joined Life as a staff writer. Later as an Army reservist, he was called back during the Korean War and served with the Pacific division of the Stars and Stripes newspaper, where he was a staff writer. On his return from Asia, McPartland settled in California and began to write on a regular basis, although he retained some desire to be an engineer. In addition to his novels, he wrote a handful of screenplays for Hollywood. On September 14, 1958, in Monterey, California, McParland suffered a heart attack and died. He was 47.

During the settlement of his estate, McPartland's personal life became national news. It was revealed during estate proceedings that he had a legal wife and son in Mill Valley, California and, at the same time, a mistress in Monterey who had borne him five children and who, as Mrs. Eleanor McPartland, was named the city's "Mother of the Year" in 1956. A daughter from an earlier marriage, in Chicago, was later acknowledged by the estate.

== Writer ==
Most of McPartland's books were published as Fawcett Gold Medal paperback originals. His novels, apart from No Down Payment, fall under the hard-boiled pulp category. The settings of his books were usually the seamy underworld of urban and suburban America, and featured plots involving romantic intrigue, international espionage, extortion, drug trafficking and crime syndicates. Japan was the backdrop for three of his books, of which two were set during the period of the post-WWII occupation, a setting McPartland seemed to have experienced firsthand, particularly areas of "sleazy, vice-ridden, post-Occupation Tokyo."

Many of McPartland's pulp novels have been reprinted since their initial publication in the 1950s; as of 2013 some are currently in print, including Big Red's Daughter and Tokyo Doll, both reissued by Black Curtain Press in 2013.

His more standard novel, No Down Payment, was later made into the movie of the same title, directed by Martin Ritt and starring Joanne Woodward and Tony Randall, among others.

McPartland also wrote four Hollywood screenplays that become movies, one of which was derived from his own work, The Wild Party, which was adapted to the screen for the 1956 movie, The Wild Party, starring Anthony Quinn. Three of McPartland's novels have been brought to the screen: No Down Payment; The Kingdom of Johnny Cool which became the 1963 movie Johnny Cool (starring Elizabeth Montgomery and Henry Silva); and the aforementioned The Wild Party.

== Works ==
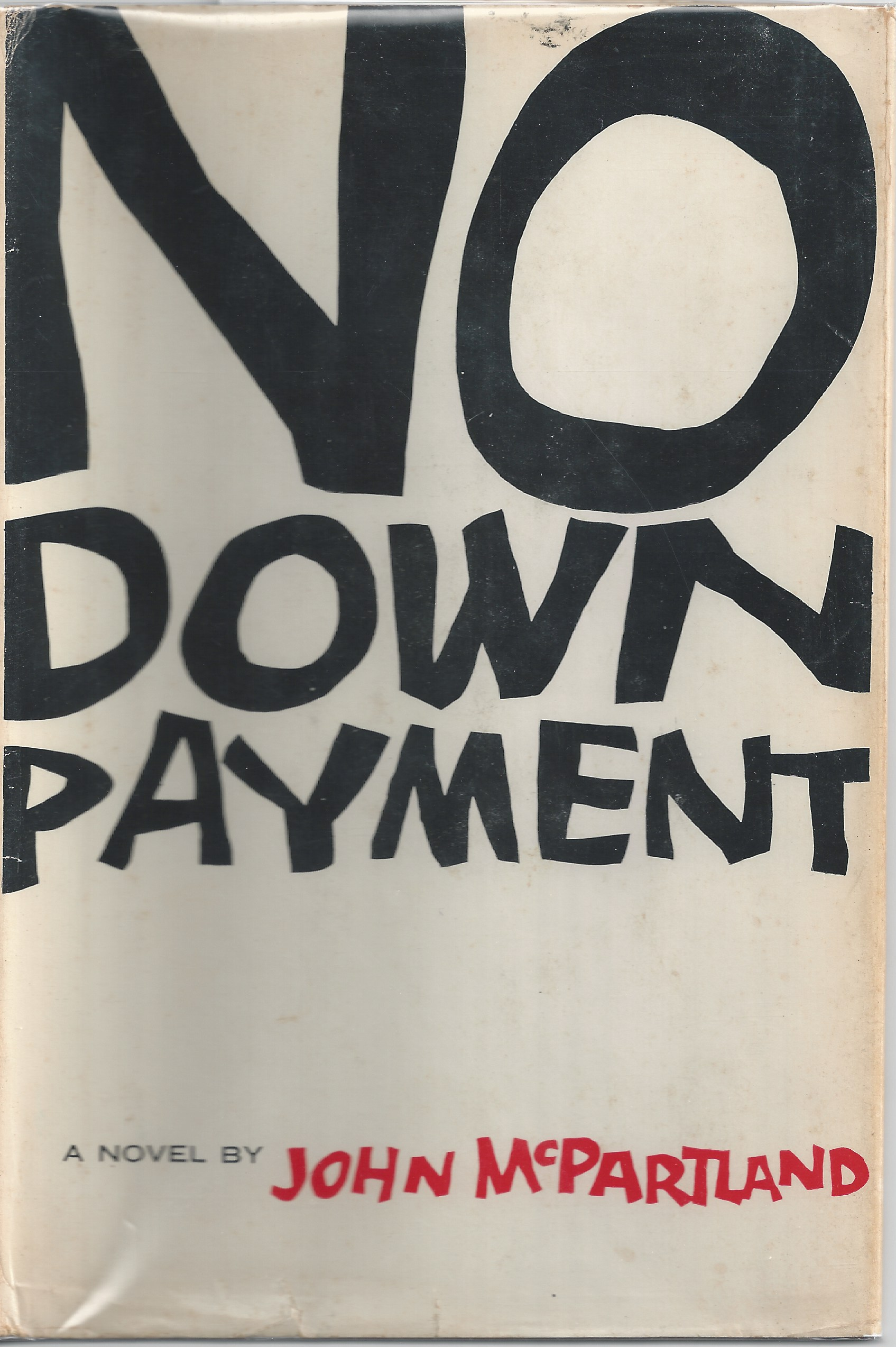
Cover of McPartland's "No Down Payment"(1957)

=== Paperback Original Novels ===
- Love Me Now (1952)
- Big Red's Daughter (1953)
- Tokyo Doll (1953)
- Affair in Tokyo (1954)
- Face of Evil (1954)
- The Wild Party (1956)
- Danger for Breakfast (1956)
- I'll See You in Hell (1956)
- Ripe Fruit (1958)
- The Kingdom of Johnny Cool (1959)
- The Last Night (1959)

=== Hardcover Novels ===
- No Down Payment (Simon & Schuster, 1957)

=== Non-fiction ===
- Sex in Our Changing World (Rinehart & Co., 1947)

=== Screenplays ===
- The Wild Party (1956)
- No Time to be Young (1957)
- Street of Sinners (1957)
- The Lost Missile (1958)

=== Article ===
- "Portrait of an American Communist," Life (January 5, 1948)

In 1948, McPartland wrote "Portrait of an American Communist," an exposé for Life magazine "in which he delved into communism's socially aberrant nature and the racy, lusty associations with free love." The subtitle reads, "After 12 years of hard work, boredom, and grim discipline, a member of the party now waits for a crisis – and power." It traces the career of "Kelly" from his exposure to Communism in high school, his luring by "pretty girls" to "Workers' School," his exposure to more "party girls" and membership in the Party, to teaching professionally on an "Adult Education Project" of the WPA. Thereafter follows a select history of the 1930s including the mention of unions (John L. Lewis, the Steel Workers Organizing Committee, the Committee for Industrial Organizations, Memorial Day massacre of 1937), the Spanish Civil War, and the Hitler-Stalin Pact. During World War II, he lies about his Party affiliation. After the war, "most of the man like 'Kelly' were told to lie low... So 'Kelly' waits..."
