= Naked Youth =

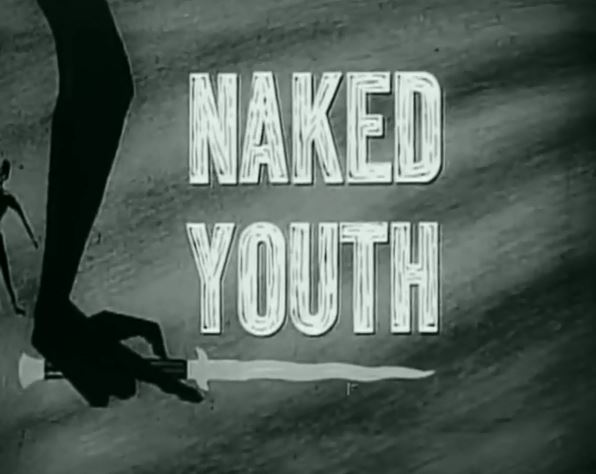
- screenshot of title
- Directed by: John F. Schreyer
- Written by: Lester Wm. Berke; Gary Judis
- Screenplay by: Lester Wm. Berke; Robert J. Black Jr. Dean Romano
- Produced by: John A. Bushelman (producer); Fred Ready (executive producer)
- Starring: Carol Ohmart; Robert Hutton
- Cinematography: Lloyd Knechtel
- Edited by: Dwight Caldwell
- Music by: Richard LaSalle
- Production company: Gold Air Shows
- Distributed by: Cinema Associates
- Release date: 1961
- Running time: 73 minutes
- Country: United States
- Language: English

Naked Youth (also known as Wild Youth) is a 1961 American action film directed by John F. Schreyer. It stars Robert Hutton and Carol Ohmart.

The film is set in New Mexico. The film features the theme of prison escape. Two escaped convicts are joined by a teenage girl who also wants to flee. They soon encounter a local drug dealer and a female heroin addict.

== Plot summary ==
Two fugitives from a New Mexico prison farm, "Switch" and Frankie, encounter a 16-year-old farm girl, Donna, and go on the run together. After accepting a ride from a stranger, Rivas, when their car breaks down, the group encounters a drug dealer and murderer, Maddo, and his strung-out girlfriend, Madge who is addicted to heroin.

== Cast ==
- Robert Hutton as Maddo
- Carol Ohmart as Madge
- Jan Brooks as Donna
- Clancy Cooper as Erickson
- Steve Rowland as Switch
- John Goddard as Rivas
- Robert Arthur as Frankie

== Production ==
It was filmed in Tucumcari, New Mexico. According to John Goddard, the cast stayed at a motel during the filming. He also said that it was originally titled Switchblade.

== Release ==
It was released on a double-bill with 48 Hours to Live (1960). It was later released on VHS by Rhino Home Video on November 19, 1987 and on DVD by Sinister Cinema.
