= Supersonic Low Altitude Missile =

Weapons delivery platform project undertaken by the United States in the 1950s

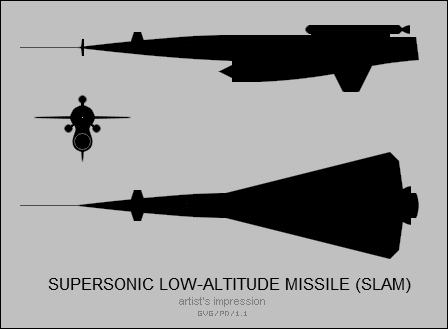

The Supersonic Low Altitude Missile or SLAM was a U.S. Air Force nuclear weapons project conceived around 1955, and cancelled in 1964. SLAMs were conceived of as unmanned nuclear-powered ramjets capable of delivering thermonuclear warheads deep into enemy territory. The development of ICBMs in the 1950s rendered the concept of SLAMs obsolete. Advances in defensive ground radar also made the stratagem of low-altitude evasion ineffective. Although it never proceeded beyond the initial design and testing phase before being declared obsolete, the design contained several radical innovations as a nuclear delivery system.

== Conceived role ==
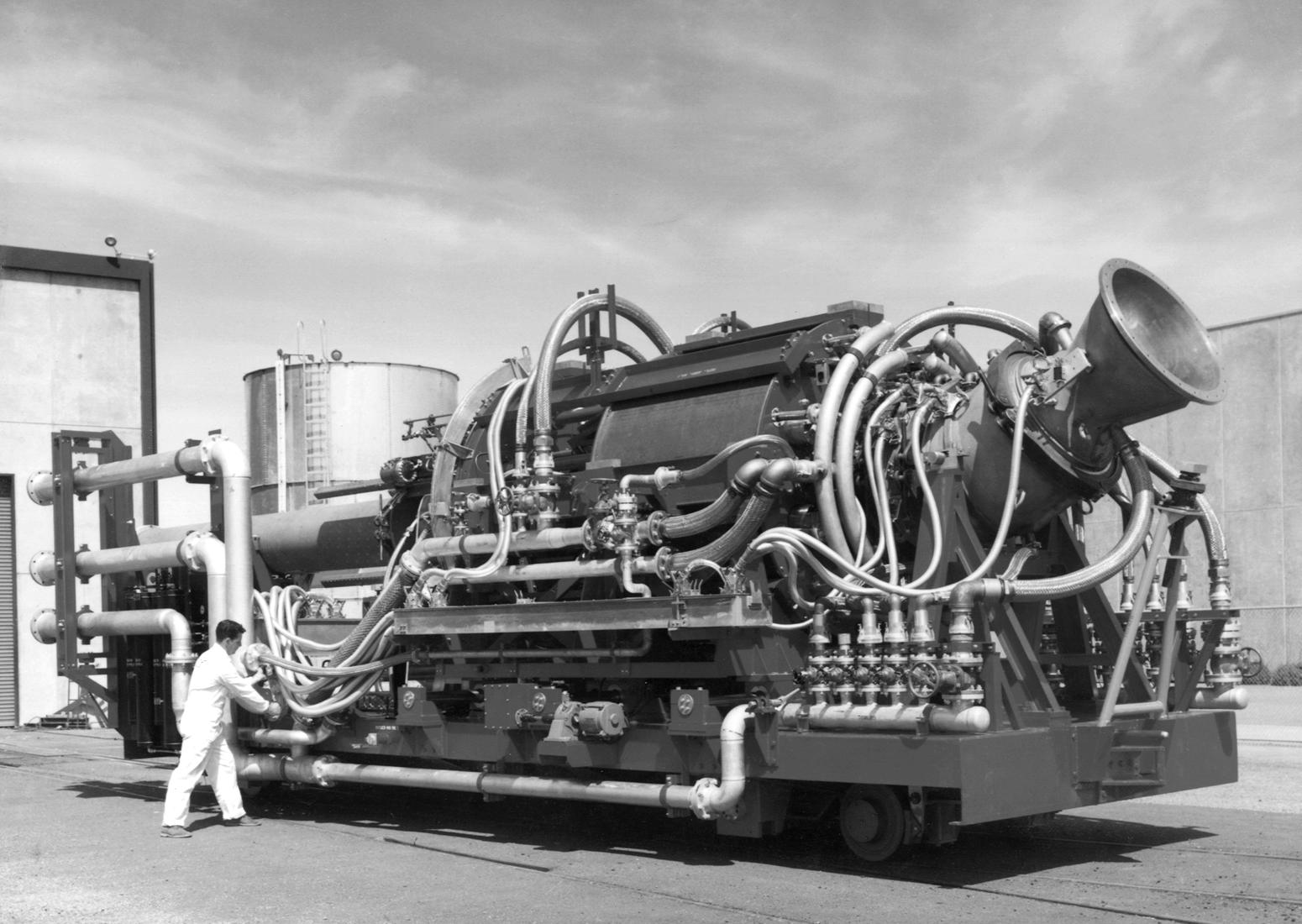
Tory II-A

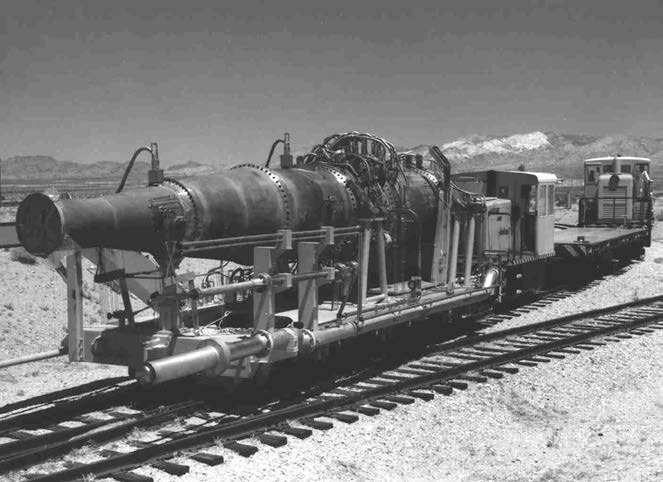
Tory II-C

The SLAM was designed to complement the doctrine of mutually assured destruction and as a possible replacement for, or augment to, the Strategic Air Command system. In the event of nuclear war it was intended to fly below the cover of enemy radar at supersonic speeds and deliver thermonuclear warheads to roughly 16 targets.

=== Innovations ===
The use of a nuclear engine in the airframe promised to give the missile staggering and unprecedented low-altitude range, estimated to be roughly 113,000 miles (182,000 km) (over 4.5 times the equatorial circumference of the Earth). Despite misinformed public opinion, the idea that the engine could act as a secondary weapon for the missile is not practical. According to Dr. Theodore C. Merkle, the head of Project Pluto, in both his testimony to Congress and in a publication regarding the nuclear ramjet propulsion system, he reassures both Congress and the public of this fact. Specifically, he states "The reactor radiations, while intense, do not lead to problems with personnel who happen to be under such a power plant passing overhead at flight speed even for very low altitudes." In both documents, he describes calculations that prove the safety of the reactor and its negligible release of fission products compared to the background. Along the same vein of these calculations, the missile would be moving too quickly to expose any living things to prolonged radiation needed to induce radiation sickness. This is due to the relatively low population of neutrons that would make it to the ground per kilometer, for a vehicle traveling at several hundred meters per second. Any radioactive fuel elements within the reactor itself would be contained and not stripped by the air to reach the ground.

Another revolutionary aspect of the SLAM was its reliance on automation. It would have the mission of a long-range bomber, but would be completely unmanned: accepting radioed commands up to its failsafe point, whereafter it would rely on a terrain contour matching (TERCOM) radar system to navigate to preprogrammed targets.

== Development ==
The primary innovation was the engine of the aircraft, which was developed under the aegis of a separate project code-named Project Pluto, after the Roman god of the underworld. It was a ramjet that used nuclear fission to superheat incoming air instead of chemical fuel. Project Pluto produced two working prototypes of this engine, the Tory-IIA and the Tory-IIC, which were successfully tested in the Nevada desert. Special ceramics had to be developed to meet the stringent weight and tremendous heat tolerances demanded of the SLAM's reactor. These were developed by the Coors Porcelain Company. The reactor itself was designed at the Lawrence Radiation Laboratory.

Although a prototype of the airframe was never constructed, the SLAM was to be a wingless, fin-guided aircraft; its appearance giving it the nickname "Flying Crowbar". Apart from the ventral ram-air intake it was very much in keeping with traditional missile design. Its estimated airspeed at 30,000 feet (9,100 m) was Mach 4.2.

The SLAM program was scrapped on July 1, 1964. By this time serious questions about its viability had been raised, such as how to test a device that would emit copious amounts of radioactive exhaust from its unshielded reactor core in flight, as well as its efficacy and cost. ICBMs promised swifter delivery to targets, and because of their speed (the Thor IRBM could reach its target in 18 minutes, whereas the SLAM would take much longer) and trajectory, were considered virtually unstoppable. The SLAM was also being outpaced by advances in defensive ground radar, which threatened to render its stratagem of low-altitude evasion ineffective.

=== Reactor design ===
The reactor had an outer diameter of 57.25 inches (1.454 m) and length 64.24 inches (1.632 m); the dimensions of the reactor core were 47.24 inches (1.200 m) diameter and 50.70 inches (1.288 m) length. The critical mass of uranium was 59.90 kg, and the reactor's power density averaged at 10 megawatts per cubic foot (350 MW/m^{3}), with total power of 600 megawatts.

The nuclear fuel elements were made of refractory ceramic based on beryllium oxide, with enriched uranium dioxide as fuel and small amount of zirconium dioxide for structural stability. The fuel elements were hollow hexagonal tubes about 4 inches (10 cm) long with 0.3 inches (7.6 mm) distance between the outer parallel planes, with inside diameter of 0.227 inches (5.8 mm). They were manufactured by high-pressure extruding of the green compact, then sintering almost to its theoretical density. The core consisted of 465,000 individual elements stacked to form 27,000 airflow channels; the design with small unattached elements reduced problems related with thermal stresses. The elements were designed for average operation temperature of 2,330 °F (1,277 °C); the autoignition temperature of the reactor base plates was only 150 °C higher. The neutron flux was calculated to be 9×10^{17} neutrons/(cm^{2}·s) in the aft and 7×10^{14} neutrons/(cm^{2}·s) in the nose. The gamma radiation level was fairly high due to the lack of shielding; radiation hardening for the guidance electronics had to be designed.

The reactors were successfully tested at Jackass Flats in the Nevada Test Site. The Tory II-A reactor, the scaled-down variant, was tested in mid-1961 and successfully ran for several seconds on May 14, 1961. A full-scale variant, the Tory II-C, was run for almost 5 minutes at full power. The latter test, limited by the air storage facility capacity, ran for 292 seconds. The air fed to the reactor was preheated to 943 °F (506 °C) and compressed to 316 psi (2.18 MPa), to simulate ramjet flight conditions.

== See also ==
- The Lost Missile – a 1958 film focusing on a similar weapon
- 9M730 Burevestnik – a Russian nuclear-powered cruise missile
- List of nuclear-powered aircraft
