= Cosmo Sardo =

Italian-born American film and television actor (1909–89)

- Sardo in The Lost Missile, 1958
- Born: March 7, 1909; Sicily, Kingdom of Italy
- Died: July 14, 1989 (aged 80); Los Angeles, California, U.S.
- Occupations: Film and television actor
- Spouse: Joanna Sardo

Cosmo Sardo (March 7, 1909 – July 14, 1989) was an Italian-born American film and television actor.

== Life and career ==
Sardo was born in Sicily, Kingdom of Italy, the son of Gataneo and Constatina Sardo. At an early age, he emigrated to the United States with his family, settling in Boston, Massachusetts. He began his screen career in 1939, with an uncredited role in the short film Mendelssohn’s Wedding March. The next year, he appeared in the film Brother Orchid. During his screen career, he worked as a barber in Hollywood, California.

Later in his career, Sardo made his television debut in the syndicated television series Adventures of Superman. He guest-starred in numerous television programs including Gunsmoke, Bonanza, The Beverly Hillbillies, Death Valley Days, The Life and Legend of Wyatt Earp, Wagon Train, The Fugitive, The Twilight Zone, Kolchak: The Night Stalker, Perry Mason, The Rockford Files, The Virginian and Bat Masterson. He also appeared in numerous films such as Ocean’s 11, Divorce American Style, The Killer That Stalked New York, The Outsider, The Law and the Lady, The Lost Missile, Les Misérables, The Mississippi Gambler, The Oscar, The Wacky Zoo of Morgan City, The Rat Race and I Married a Woman.

Sardo retired from acting in 1984, last appearing in the NBC police procedural television series Hill Street Blues.

== Death ==
Sardo died on July 14, 1989, in Los Angeles, California, at the age of 80.
