= Project Pluto =

US nuclear ramjet project, 1957–1964

Tory II-C
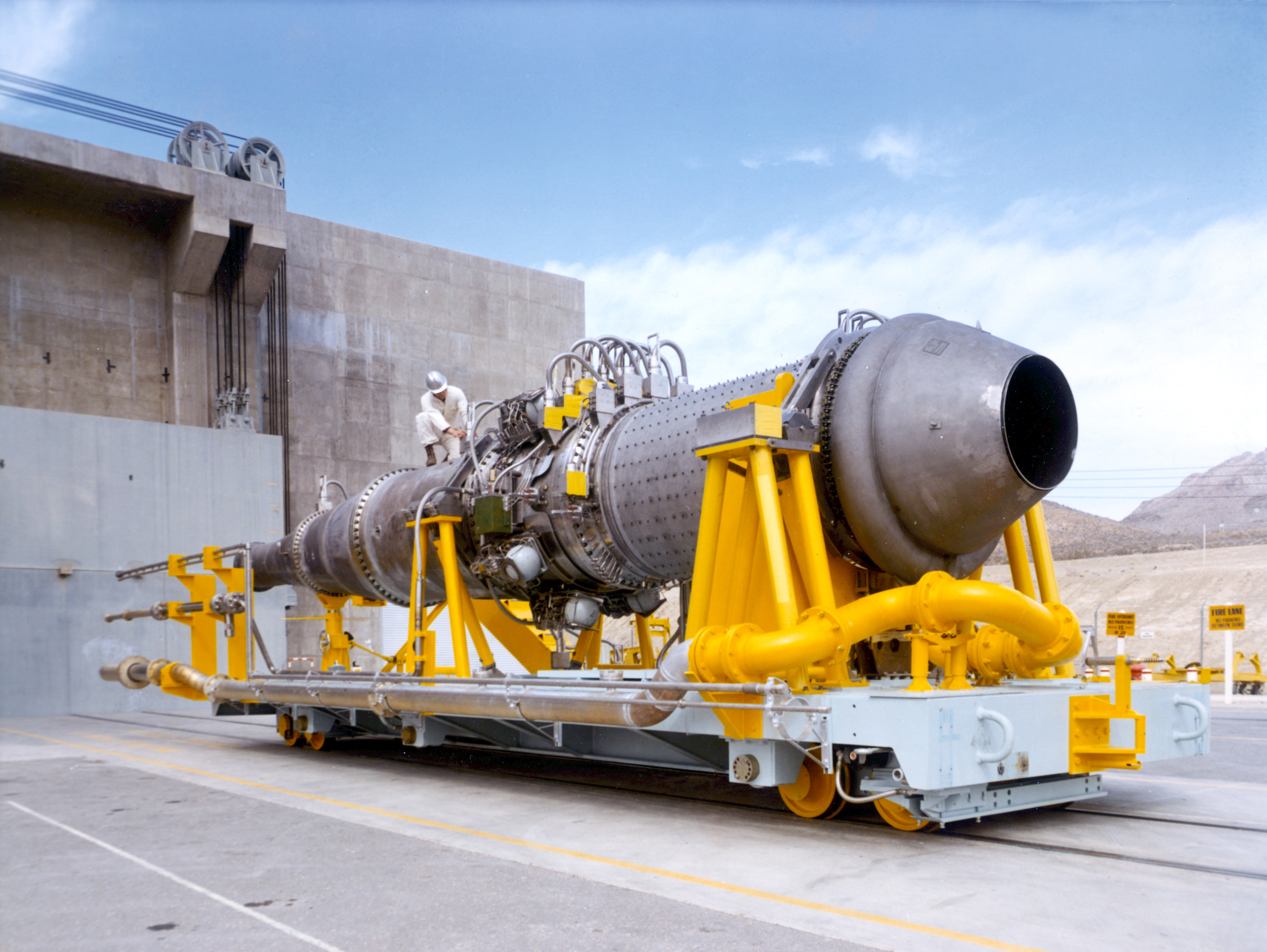
- Tory-IIC nuclear ramjet
- Reactor concept: High temperature gas-cooled reactor
- Status: Decommissioned
- Location: Jackass Flats
- Coordinates: 36°48′59″N 116°9′52″W

Main parameters of the reactor core
- Fuel (fissile material): highly enriched uranium oxide
- Fuel state: solid
- Neutron energy spectrum: slow
- Primary control method: Boron control drums
- Primary moderator: Beryllium oxide
- Primary coolant: air

Reactor usage
- Primary use: propulsion
- Power (thermal): 600 MWth (design capacity)
- Criticality (date): 20 May 1964
- Operator/owner: Lawrence Radiation Laboratory

Project Pluto was a United States government program to develop nuclear-powered ramjet engines for use in cruise missiles. Two experimental engines were tested at the Nevada Test Site (NTS) in 1961 and 1964 respectively.

On 1 January 1957, the U.S. Air Force and the U.S. Atomic Energy Commission selected the Lawrence Radiation Laboratory to study the feasibility of applying heat from a nuclear reactor to power a ramjet engine for a Supersonic Low Altitude Missile. This would have many advantages over other contemporary nuclear weapons delivery systems: operating at Mach 3, or around 3,700 kilometers per hour (2,300 mph), and flying as low as 150 meters (500 ft), it would be invulnerable to interception by contemporary air defenses, carry more nuclear warheads with greater nuclear weapon yield, deliver them with greater accuracy than was possible with intercontinental ballistic missiles (ICBMs) at the time, and, unlike them, could be recalled.

This research became known as Project Pluto, and was directed by Theodore Charles (Ted) Merkle, leader of the laboratory's Radiation Division. Originally carried out at Livermore, California, testing was moved to new facilities constructed for $1.2 million (equivalent to $10 million in 2025) on 21 square kilometers (8 sq mi) at NTS Site 401, also known as Jackass Flats. The test reactors were moved about on a railroad car that could be controlled remotely. The need to maintain supersonic speed at low altitude and in all kinds of weather meant that the reactor had to survive high temperatures and intense radiation. Ceramic nuclear fuel elements contained highly enriched uranium oxide fuel and beryllium oxide was used both as neutron moderator and as neutron reflector.

After a series of preliminary tests to verify the integrity of the components under conditions of strain and vibration, Tory II-A, the world's first nuclear ramjet engine, was run at full power (46 MW) on 14 May 1961. A larger, fully-functional ramjet engine was then developed called Tory II-C. This was run at full power (461 MW) on 20 May 1964, thereby demonstrating the feasibility of a nuclear-powered ramjet engine. Despite these and other successful tests, ICBM technology developed quicker than expected, and this reduced the need for cruise missiles. By the early 1960s, there was greater sensitivity about the dangers of radioactive emissions in the atmosphere, and devising an appropriate test plan for the necessary flight tests was difficult. On 1 July 1964, seven years and six months after it was started, Project Pluto was canceled.

== Origins ==
During the 1950s, the United States Air Force (USAF) considered the use of nuclear powered aircraft and missiles as part of its Aircraft Nuclear Propulsion project, which was coordinated by the Aircraft Nuclear Propulsion Office. Research into missiles was coordinated by its Missile Projects Branch. The concept of using a shieldless nuclear reactor to provide a heat source for a ramjet was explored by Frank E. Rom and Eldon W. Sams at the National Advisory Committee for Aeronautics Lewis Research Center in 1954 and 1955. The principle behind the nuclear ramjet was relatively simple: motion of the vehicle pushed air in through the front of the vehicle (the ram effect). If a nuclear reactor heated the air, the hot air expanded at higher speed out through a nozzle at the back, providing thrust.

At the time, the United States Atomic Energy Commission (AEC) was conducting studies of the use of a nuclear thermal rocket as an upper stage of an intercontinental ballistic missile (ICBM) on behalf of the USAF. The AEC farmed this work out to its two rival atomic weapons laboratories, the Los Alamos Scientific Laboratory (LASL) in Los Alamos, New Mexico, and the Lawrence Radiation Laboratory at Livermore, California. By late 1956 improvements in nuclear weapon design had reduced the need for a nuclear upper stage, and the development effort was concentrated at LASL, where it became known as Project Rover.

On 1 January 1957, the USAF and the AEC selected the Livermore Laboratory to study the design of a nuclear reactor to power ramjet engines. This research became known as Project Pluto. It was directed by Theodore C. (Ted) Merkle, leader of the Laboratory's R Division.

== Development ==
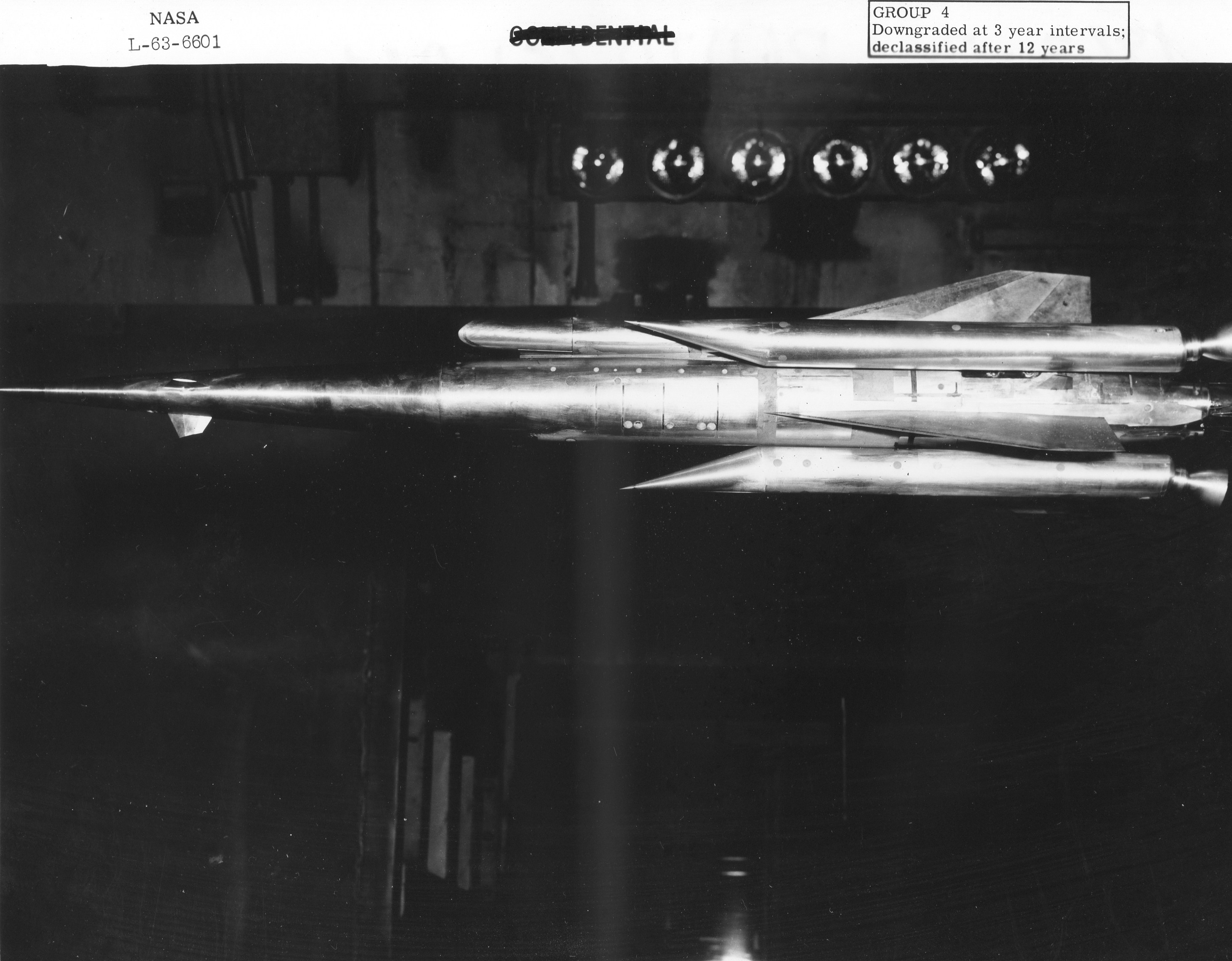
Test of the aerodynamic characteristics of a Supersonic Low Altitude Missile (SLAM) or Low Altitude Supersonic Vehicle (LASV) configuration that was to be powered by nuclear ramjet engines developed in Project Pluto

The proposed use for nuclear-powered ramjets would be to power a cruise missile, called Supersonic Low Altitude Missile (SLAM). It would have many advantages over other nuclear weapons delivery systems. It was estimated that the reactor would weigh between 23,000 and 91,000 kilograms (50,000 and 200,000 lb), permitting a payload of over 23,000 kilograms (50,000 lb). Operating at Mach 3, or around 3,700 kilometers per hour (2,300 mph) and flying as low as 150 meters (500 ft), it would be invulnerable to interception by contemporary air defenses. It could carry more nuclear warheads than the sixteen aboard a Polaris ballistic missile submarine, they could be larger, with nuclear weapon yields of up to 10 megatonnes of TNT (42 PJ), and delivered with greater accuracy. Moreover, unlike an ICBM, it could be recalled.

It was estimated that the unit cost of each missile would be less than $5 million (equivalent to $41 million in 2025), making them much cheaper than a Boeing B-52 Stratofortress bomber. Operating costs would also be low, as keeping them in readiness would be cheaper than a submarine or bomber, and comparable with a missile silo-based ICBM. Range would not be unlimited, but would be determined by the fuel load. Merkle calculated that a MW-day of energy would burn about one gram of highly enriched uranium. A 490 MW reactor with 50 kilograms of uranium would therefore burn 1 percent of its fuel each day. Assuming that an accumulation of neutron poisons could be avoided, the missile could fly for several days. The success of the project depended upon a series of technological advances in metallurgy and materials science. Pneumatic motors necessary to control the reactor in flight had to operate while red-hot and in the presence of intense ionizing radiation. The need to maintain supersonic speed at low altitude and in all kinds of weather meant that the missile would have to fly though much denser air. In turn, this meant that it would encounter much greater air resistance and have to generate more power to overcome it. The reactor, code-named "Tory", would therefore have to survive high temperatures that would melt the metals used in most jet and rocket engines.

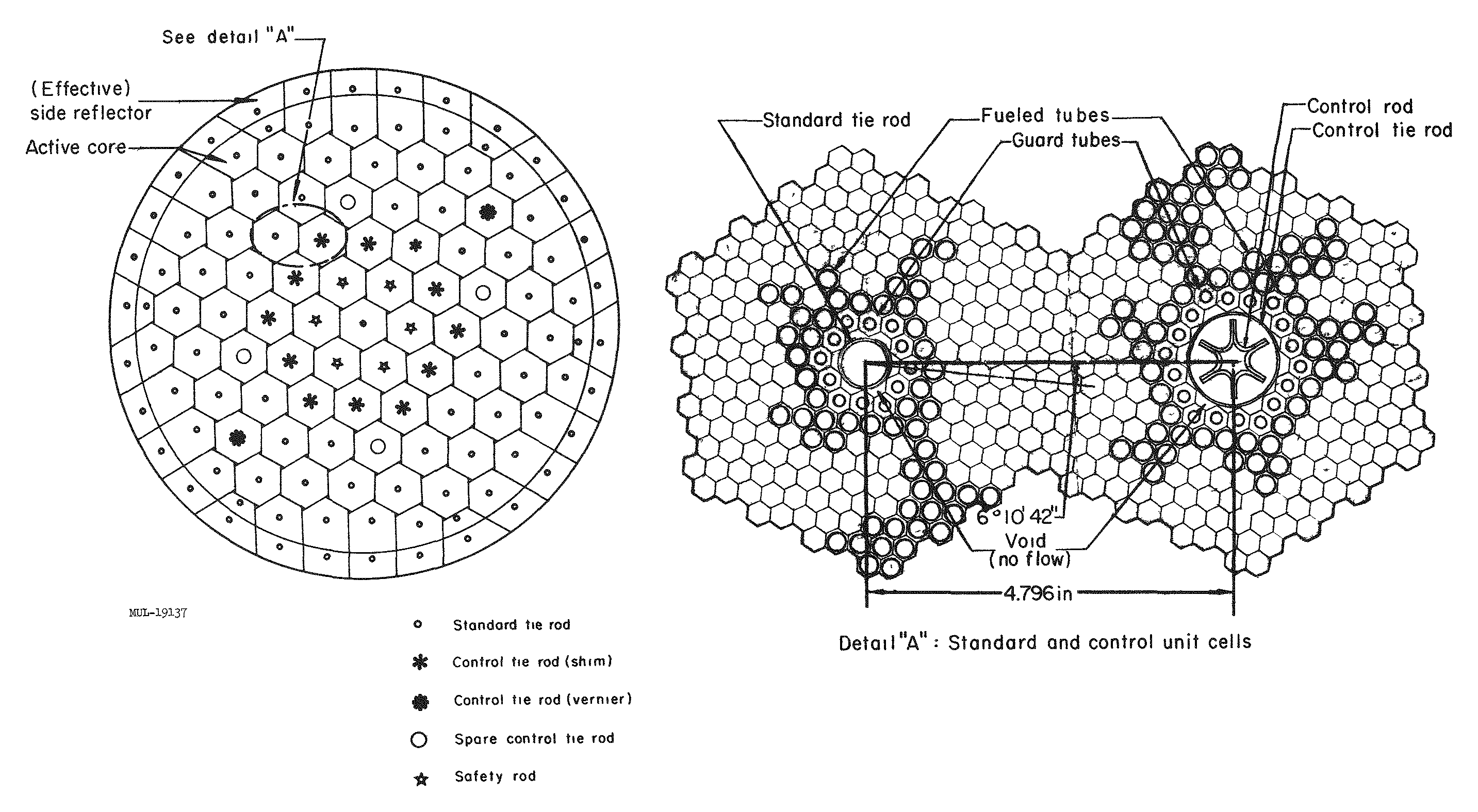
Schematic cross-section of Tory reactor

The solution arrived at was to use ceramic fuel elements, extruded into hollow hexagonal rods. The core of the reactor would be made of enriched uranium dispersed in beryllium oxide (BeO), the only available neutron moderator material that could withstand the high temperatures required. The Tory II-A reactor used a dispersion of enriched uranium in BeO, but by the time Tory II-C was built zirconia and yttria was added in a 1.06:1:1 molar ratio of urania:zirconia:yttria. The tubes consisted of a BeO matrix containing, in a solid solution, a dispersion of urania (UO_{2}), zirconia (ZrO_{2}) and yttria (Y_{2}O_{3}) with a grain size between 5 and 20 micrometers (200 and 790 μin) in diameter. The zirconia and yttria stabilized the urania against phase transition to triuranium octoxide (U_{3}O_{8}) at temperatures around 1,200 °C (2,190 °F). The dispersed fuel particles of the urania-zirconia-yttria mixture (known as "horseradish") were mostly from 0.5 to 1 micrometer (20 to 39 μin) in size, although some were smaller or larger. The uranium was in the form of uranium enriched to 93.2 percent uranium-235 (known as "oralloy").

The tubes had a hexagonal cross-section measuring 7.5 millimeters (0.297 in) from one flat side to the opposite, with a 5.8 millimeters (0.227 in) diameter hole in the center. They were closely packed to form a honeycomb pattern. Over 80 percent of the fueled tubes were 9.97 centimeters (3.925 in) long; the rest varied in length so as to achieve the correct column length and arrangement. The metal tie rods were made of René 41 and Hastelloy R235 and were cooled so they did not exceed 760 °C (1,400 °F). The ceramic tubes surrounding the tie rods (known as guard tubes) were unfueled and had smaller 3.3-millimeter (0.130 in) diameter holes. The core was surrounded by neutron reflectors on all sides. The forward reflector was 250 millimeters (9.7 in) thick and the aft reflector 61 millimeters (2.4 in) thick. Both were composed of BeO tubes. The side reflector consisted of 51 millimeters (2 in) of BeO tubes around which was 25 millimeters (1 in) of nickel shims. The reactor was controlled through the movement of hafnium control rods that moved axially within the tie rods. Twelve of the rods, known as shim rods, were located about 230 millimeters (9 in) from the central axis of the core, while two were located closer to the reflector; one was a vernier rod and the other as a safety rod. Normally the movement of the rods was restricted to 7.6 centimeters per second (3 in/s) but in the event of a scram they could be moved in 1.5 seconds. The shim rods were moved by four actuators, each of which handled three shim rods. The shim rods were 1,607 millimeters (63.25 in) long and 25 millimeters (1.0 in) in diameter, with a 100-centimeter (40 in) travel.

The contract to manufacture the fuel elements was awarded to the Coors Porcelain Company. The process of making horseradish involved mixing sinterable BeO powder with oralloy uranyl nitrate, yttrium nitrate and zirconium nitrate to form a slurry which was coprecipitated by adding ammonium nitrate. Because the process involved oralloy, criticality safety required a long, narrow geometry for the mix tanks. The mixture was filtered, dried and calcined at 538 °C (1,000 °F). It was then blended with a binding mixture containing polyvinyl alcohol, methyl cellulose and water and extruded through a die at 55,000 to 69,000 kilopascals (8,000 to 10,000 psi) to form the tubes. The tubes were dried, the binder was burned out by heating to 820 °C (1,500 °F), and they were fired in hydrogen at 1,700 °C (3,090 °F) to densify them. The maximum permissible effect on reactivity due to impurities in the tubes was 2 to 3 percent. In practice it was only 0.5 percent.

== Test facilities ==
Tests were conducted at new facilities constructed for $1.2 million (equivalent to $10 million in 2025) on 21 square kilometers (8 sq mi) of Jackass Flats at the AEC's Nevada Test Site (NTS), known as Site 401. The facilities there were shared with Project Rover. The complex included 10 kilometers (6 mi) of roads, critical-assembly building, control building, assembly and shop buildings, and utilities.

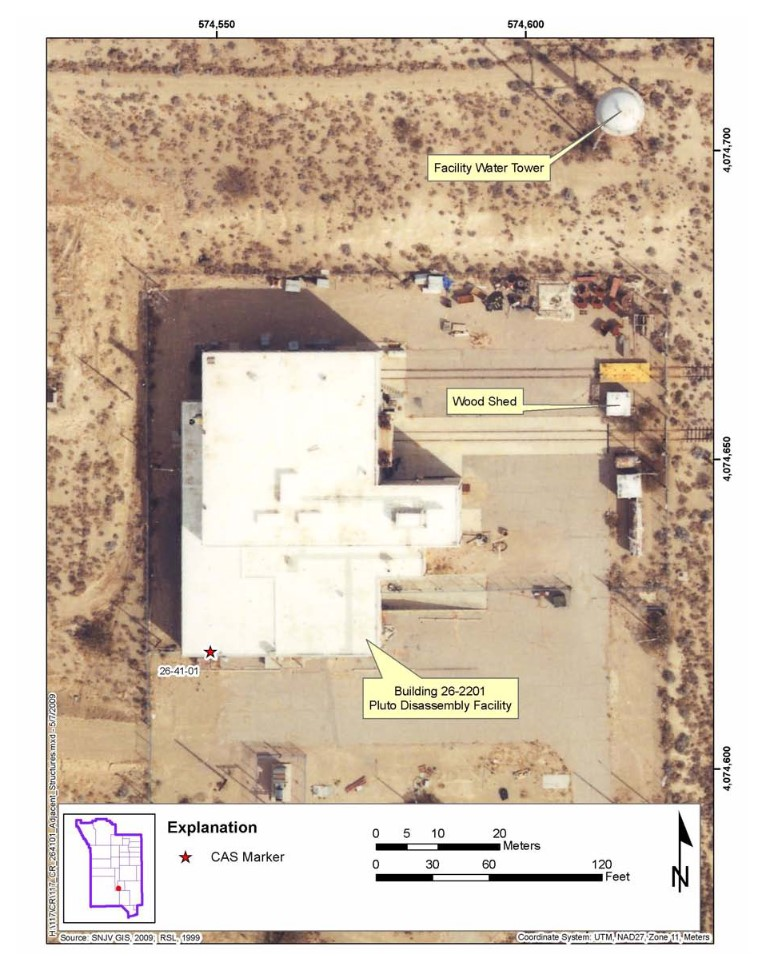
Building 2201 from above

An aggregate mine was purchased to supply the concrete for the walls of the disassembly building, Building 2201, which were 1.8 to 2.4 meters (6 to 8 ft) thick. Building 2201 was designed to allow radioactive components to be adjusted, disassembled or replaced remotely. Operations in the main disassembly bay could be viewed through 1.2-meter (4 ft) lead glass viewing windows. Hot cells adjacent to the disassembly bay were used to monitor the control rod actuators. Vaults within each cell were equipped with remote manipulators.

All controls were located in the central control room, which was air conditioned with a positive pressure so that air always flowed toward the disassembly bay and the hot cells, and the used air from them was passed through filters. The main disassembly bay and the hot cells were accessible through openings that were normally covered with lead plates. There were showers and a radiation safety room for workers. Building 2201 also contained a maintenance shop, darkroom, offices, and equipment storage rooms. Scientists monitored the tests remotely via a television hook up from a tin shed located at a safe distance that had a fallout shelter stocked with two weeks' supply of food and water in the event of a major catastrophe.

Some 40 kilometers (25 mi) of 25-centimeter (10 in) oil well casing was necessary to store the approximately 540,000 kilograms (1,200,000 lb) of compressed air at 25,000 kilopascals (3,600 psi) used to simulate ramjet flight conditions for Pluto. Three giant compressors were borrowed from the Naval Submarine Base New London in Groton, Connecticut that could replenish the farm in five days. A five-minute, full-power test involved 910 kilograms per second (2,000 lb/s) of air being forced over 14 million 2.5-centimeter (1 in) diameter steel balls that were held in four steel tanks which were heated to 730 °C (1,350 °F).

Because the test reactors were highly radioactive once they were started, they were transported to and from the test site on railroad cars. The "Jackass and Western Railroad", as it was light-heartedly described, was said to be the world's shortest and slowest railroad. There were two locomotives, the remotely controlled electric L-1, and the diesel/electric L-2, which was manually controlled but had radiation shielding around the cab. The former was normally used; the latter was as a backup. The Cold Assembly Bay (Room 101) in Building 2201 was used for storage and assembly of components of the reactor test vehicle. It also contained a maintenance service pit and battery charger for the locomotives.

== Tory II-A ==
In 1957, the Livermore Laboratory began working on a prototype reactor called Tory II-A to test the proposed design. It was initially intended to build two Tory II-A test reactors, which were designated IIA-1 and IIA-2; ultimately only one was built. Its purpose was to test the design under conditions similar to that in a ramjet engine. To save time, money, and reduce its complexity, Tory II-A had a diameter about a third of that required for the engine, a much smaller diameter than the final design. To allow it to still reach criticality with reduced fuel, the core was surrounded by a thick nuclear graphite neutron reflector.

The Tory II-A design process was completed by early 1960. During the summer and early fall of that year, the core was assembled at Livermore inside a special fixture in a shielded containment building. It reached criticality on 7 October with the control vanes rotated 90° from the full shutdown position. A test was then carried out with the cooling passages of the core and neutron reflector filled with water. Instead of the predicted increase in reactivity, there was a drop, and the reactor could not go critical at all. The water was replaced with heavy water, but it only barely reached criticality. It was therefore concluded that additional fuel would be required to attain the required margin for error when more components were installed.

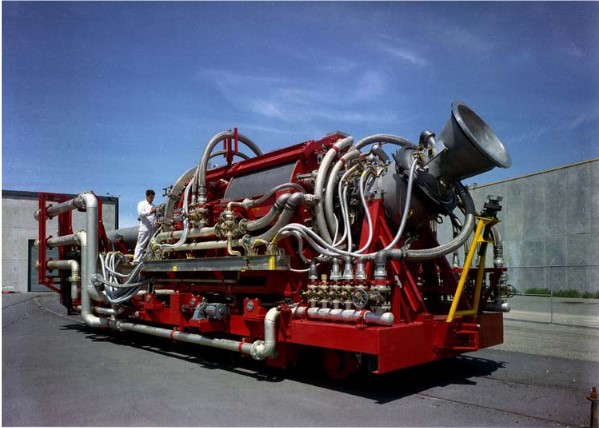
The Tory-IIA prototype

The reactor was shipped to the Nevada Test Site for a series of dry runs and zero- or low-power tests. Another layer of 10-centimeter (4 in) fuel elements was added. The reactor was mounted on the test vehicle and, with heavy water for coolant, reached criticality during a test run on 9 December, with the control vanes at 65°. It was estimated that without the heavy water, 71° would have been required. Boron rods were then inserted into the six central tie tubes. This lowered the reactivity of the core, and the vanes had to be turned to 132° before criticality was achieved. U-235 activation foils were placed in the core tie tubes to measure the core local power density, and the reactor was run at 150 W for ten minutes.

The next set of tests involved blowing air through the reactor while it was subcritical to test the integrity of the components under conditions of strain and vibration. On 17 and 18 December, air flow rates of 27, 34, 45 and 150 kilograms per second (60, 75, 100 and 330 lb/s) for 30 seconds. During what was intended to be the final qualification test on 11 January 1961, with an air flow rate of 330 kilograms per second (720 lb/s) and a core temperature of 571 °C (1,060 °F), the clamp holding the exit nozzle to the air duct on the test vehicle broke, and the nozzle flew 150 meters (480 ft) through the air. Following this mishap, it was decided to conduct a test of radio-controlled disconnection and removal of the reactor from the test vehicle. During this test the electrically controlled coupler between the locomotive and the test vehicle suddenly opened, and the test vehicle careened down the track and violently struck the concrete face of the test pad bunker at the end. The test vehicle was extensively damaged, and had to be stripped down and rebuilt. All the reactor components had to be checked for cracks.

With repairs completed, the Tory II-A was returned to the test pad for another series of tests. It was found that without cooling water, the reactor reached criticality with the control vanes at 75°; with heavy water for coolant it was reached with them at 67°. With hot air flowing through the reactor, the core temperature was raised to 220 °F (104 °C), then to 440 °F (227 °C), and finally to 635 °F (335 °C). It was then operated at 10 KW for 60 seconds at 643 °F (339 °C). A final test was conducted on 3 May, with an air flow rate of 54 kilograms per second (120 lb/s), a core temperature of 204 °C (400 °F) and no incidents.

Tory II-A was operated at its designed value on 14 May 1961, when it reached a power output of 46 MW with a core temperature of 1,420 °C (2,580 °F). Three high power test runs were conducted on 28 September, 5 October and 6 October. These reached power levels of 144, 166 and 162 MW with core temperatures of 1,280, 1,260 and 1,450 °C (2,330, 2,300 and 2,640 °F) respectively. With the tests conducted successfully, the reactor was disassembled between December 1961 and September 1962.

== Tory II-C ==
Tory II-A tested the reactor design and the integrity of the fuel elements under a simulation of operational conditions. Livermore now produced a second reactor, Tory II-C, which would be a fully functional engine for a ramjet missile. Issues that had been ignored in the design of Tory II-A had to be resolved in that of Tory II-C. The new design was complete by August 1962. The Tory II-C reactor was cylindrical in shape, 2.6 meters (8.5 ft) long and 1.45 meters (4.75 ft) in diameter. It contained about 293,000 fueled and 16,000 unfueled beryllium oxide tubes, which occupied 55 percent of its volume. The fuel loading varied through the reactor to achieve the right power profile. In operation, the core generated 350 megawatts per cubic meter (10 MW/ft^{3}). Tory II-C was fueled with 63.5 kilograms (140 lb) of enriched uranium.

The checkout of the test facilities for Tory II-C testing commenced on 17 November 1962. The facilities were incomplete when this testing began, so many of the tests were in support of the construction program. These tests fell into four categories: testing of the air supply system; testing of the other facilities components; qualification of the test vehicle; and operator training. The facilities checkout ended on 5 March 1964, by which time 82 tests had been carried out.

Before attempting a high power reactor test, five major tests were performed. The first test, conducted on 23 March, was a subcritical test of the twelve hand-inserted and six electrically-activated auxiliary shutdown rods. The purpose of the test was to verify that the operational rods could be removed safely so long as the auxiliary rods were in place. This would mean that staff would not have to be removed from the test bunker area during checkout. The test was conducted as if it were a critical one, with all personnel evacuated from the test area and the test managed remotely from the control room. The test verified the predictions made at Livermore; the operational rods could be withdrawn safely. A cold critical test was then conducted the following day to verify that the instrumentation was working correctly.

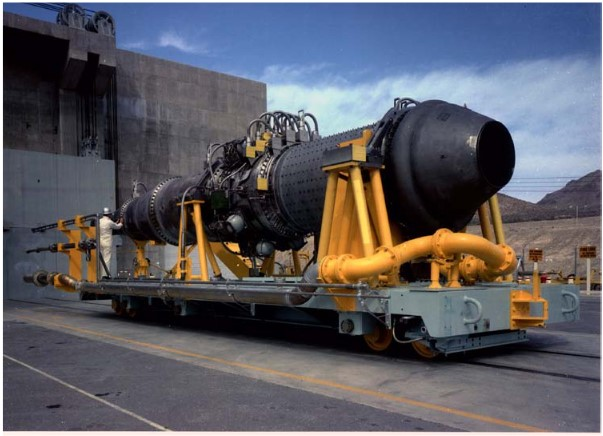
The Tory-IIC prototype

Hot zero-power tests were conducted on 9 and 23 April. These involved testing the core under air flow conditions approaching those of a full power run. The test plan for the first test called for running air at 427 °C (800 °F) at a rate of 270 kilograms per second (600 lb/s) for 60 seconds. The test was aborted and the shim rods scrammed (shut down the reactor) when vibration exceeded a pre-set level. It turned out that the vibration of the core was not the problem: it was the transducers used to measure vibration that were not operating properly. Loose connections were repaired, and a second test scheduled. This time it was planned to operate successively at 91, 181, 272, 363, 544 and 816 kilograms per second (200, 400, 600, 800, 1,200 and 1,800 lb/s). This was done, and there was no vibration. The test also qualified the thermocouples used to monitor the core's temperature.

The next step was to conduct a low power test with 454 °C (850 °F) air at 820 kilograms per second (1,800 lb/s) on 7 May. As the air flow was reaching its maximum, shim actuator B2 became noisy and was placed on hold. Then, soon after the maximum was reached, actuator A1 detected a loss of air pressure and scrammed. Actuators A2 and B1 began moving to compensate for the loss of reactivity. A manual scram was then ordered, although in hindsight this was unnecessary. The problem with B2 was traced to a faulty wire, and the problem with A1 to a faulty pressure switch. Since there were no outstanding problems, the decision was taken to proceed with an intermediate power test on 12 May. This test aimed to simulate the conditions of a Mach 2.8 flight at 3,000 meters (10,000 ft). The reactor was taken to critical and the power increased to 750 kW. Air flow was then increased to 570 kilograms per second (1,260 lb/s) at an average temperature of 1,091 °C (1,995 °F). The core reached 1,242 °C (2,268 °F). The test was concluded after an hour and 45 minutes.

The stage was now set for a full power test on 20 May 1964. This would simulate a Mach 2.8 flight on a hot 38 °C (100 °F) day at sea level. The reactor was started and power raised to 700 kW. Air was introduced at 91 kilograms per second (200 lb/s) and then raised to 190 kilograms per second (410 lb/s). The reactor power was then increased to around 76 MW, at which point the core temperature was 940 °C (1,730 °F). All systems were functioning normally, so the airflow was increased to 754 kilograms per second (1,663 lb/s) and power increased until the core temperature reached 1,242 °C (2,268 °F), at which point the power output was around 461 MW. The reactor was run for five minutes, after which a manual scram was initiated, and the airflow reduced to 91 kilograms per second (200 lb/s) for two minutes. The whole test took about an hour. Inspection of the reactor afterward was done without disassembly. No blockages or anomalies were detected. The control rods were all in place, and there was no evidence of damage or corrosion.

== Termination ==
Despite the successful tests, the Department of Defense, the sponsor of the Pluto project, had second thoughts. ICBM technology had developed more quickly than expected, reducing the need for such highly capable cruise missiles. There were concerns about whether something so noisy, hot and radioactive could go undetected, and it would be dangerous to anyone and anything in its path. An ICBM traveled to its target faster and was less vulnerable to interception by Soviet air defenses. The main advantage of the SLAM was its ability to carry a larger payload, but the value of this was diminished by improvements in nuclear weapon design that made them smaller and lighter, and the subsequent development of multiple warhead capability in ICBMs.

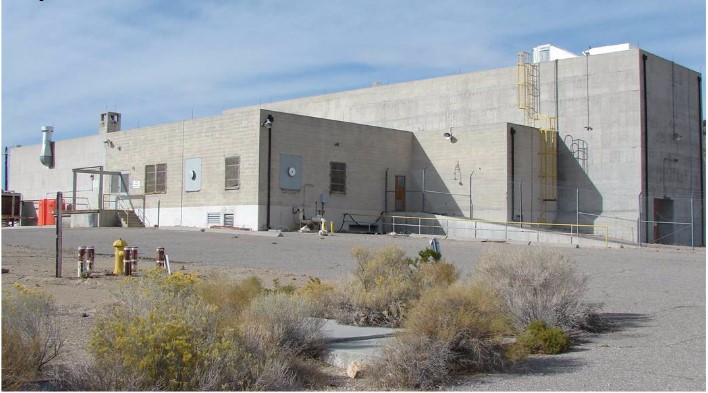
Building 2201 in 2007

The other major problem with the SLAM concept was the environmental damage caused by radioactive emissions during flight, and the disposal of the reactor at the end of the mission. In addition to the ejection of radioactive gases during the flight, Merkle estimated that about 100 grams of fission products would be produced, of which he expected a few grams to be released and dispersed over a wide area. Atmospheric nuclear testing was still ongoing in the early 1960s, so the radioactive emissions were not considered to be a major problem by comparison. Although small compared to that produced by a nuclear explosion, it was a problem for testing. The noise level was estimated to be a deafening 150 decibels. There was also the possibility of the missile going out of control.

The idea of testing it over Nevada was quickly discarded. It was proposed to conduct test flights in the vicinity of Wake Island, flying a figure-eight course. The reactor would then be dumped into the Pacific Ocean where it was 6,000 meters (20,000 ft) deep. By the early 1960s there was increasing public awareness of the undesirable environmental impacts of radioactive contamination of the atmosphere and the ocean, and the radioactive emissions from the missile were considered unacceptable wherever the tests were conducted.

The AEC requested $8 million (equivalent to $63 million in 2025) in fiscal year 1965 for continued tests of Tory II-C and the development of Tory III, an improved version. In April 1964, the Joint Committee on Atomic Energy recommended that $1.5 million be cut from this request. This provided continued funding for Tory II-C, but not for the development of Tory III. The Department of Defense's Director of Research and Engineering, Harold Brown, favored the continuation of Project Pluto at a low level of funding to progress the technology. This was rejected by the House Appropriations Committee; the technology had been demonstrated by the successful Tory II-C tests, and if there was no longer a military requirement for it, there was no reason to continue funding. It therefore cut another $5.5 million from the funding request, leaving only $1 million for "mothballing" the project.

On 1 July 1964, seven years and six months after it was started, Project Pluto was canceled. Merkle hosted a celebratory dinner at a nearby country club for project participants where SLAM tie tacks and bottles of "Pluto" mineral water were given away as souvenirs. At its peak, Project Pluto had employed around 350 people at Livermore and 100 at Site 401, and the total amount spent had been about $260 million (equivalent to $2 billion in 2025).

== Cleanup ==
The Tory II-C reactor was not disassembled after the high-power test and remained at Jackass Flats until 1976, when it was disassembled at the Engine Maintenance, Assembly, and Disassembly (E-MAD) building there. In 1971 and 1972, Building 2201 was used by the Fuel Repackaging Operations Project. Fuel elements from the Tory II reactors were removed from the hot cells in Building 2201 and taken to Area 6, from whence they were shipped to the Idaho National Laboratory. Building 2201 was used in the 1970s and 1980s to house the Hydrogen Content Test Facility. Starting in 1986, the Sandia National Laboratory used it for a series of classified projects related to nuclear weapons, and in 1998 an unidentified organization used it for a classified project. Building 2201 was cleaned and decontaminated between 2007 and 2009 to make it safe for future demolition. In September 2013, it was reported that it had been demolished.

== See also ==
- 9M730 Burevestnik, a similar Russian Project
