= North Fork White River =

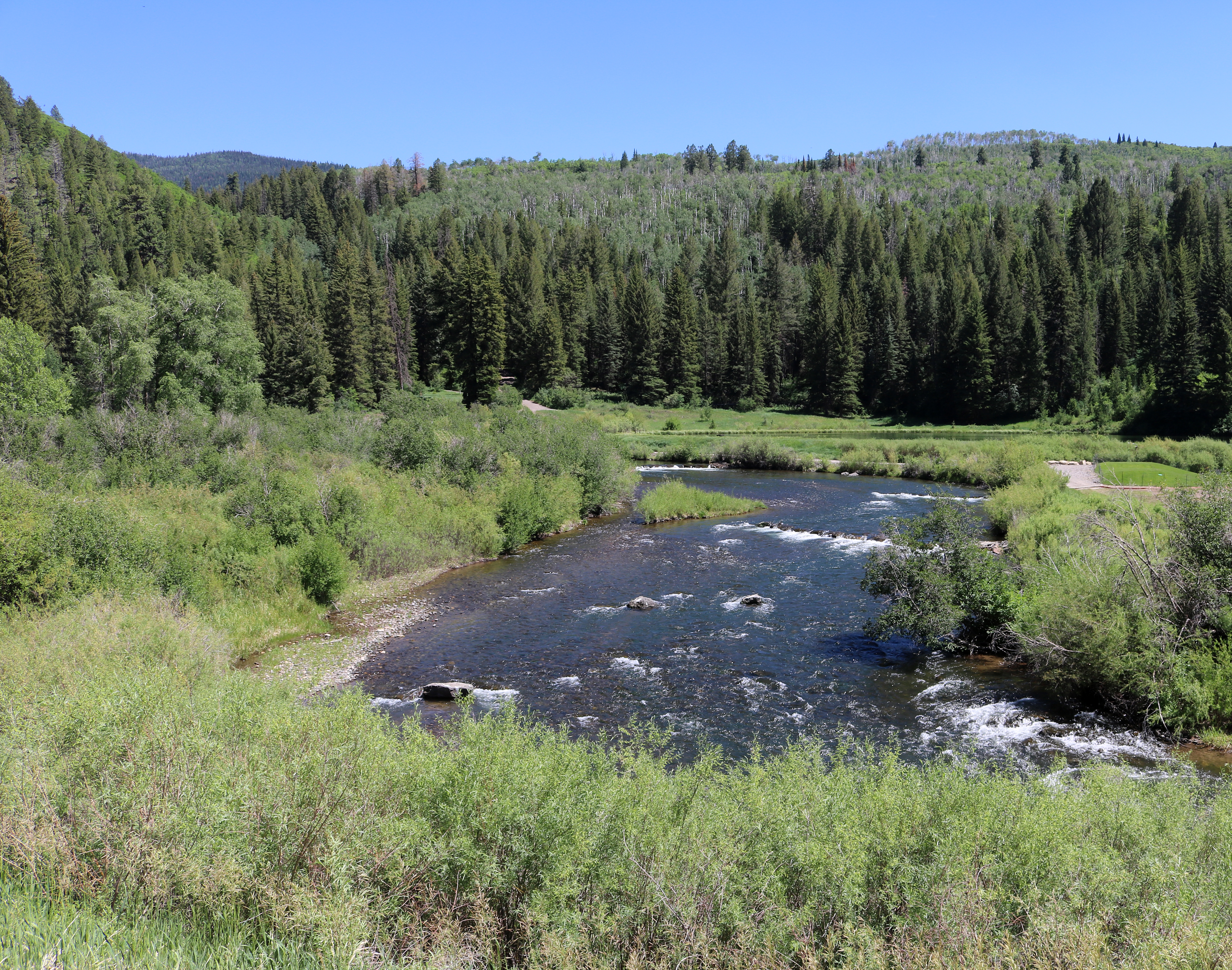
- The river northeast of Buford

Physical characteristics
- Source
  - location: Wall Lake
  - coordinates: 39°57′11″N 107°14′27″W
- Mouth
  - location: Confluence with South Fork White River
  - coordinates: 39°58′23″N 107°38′18″W
  - elevation: 6,932 ft (2,113 m)

Basin features
- Progression: White—Green—Colorado

The North Fork White River is a 33.0-mile-long (53.1 km) tributary of the White River. The river's source is Wall Lake in the Flat Tops Wilderness Area of Garfield County, Colorado. It joins with the South Fork White River in Rio Blanco County to form the White River.

== See also ==
- List of rivers of Colorado
- List of tributaries of the Colorado River
