= Kenney Reservoir =

- Taylor Draw Reservoir
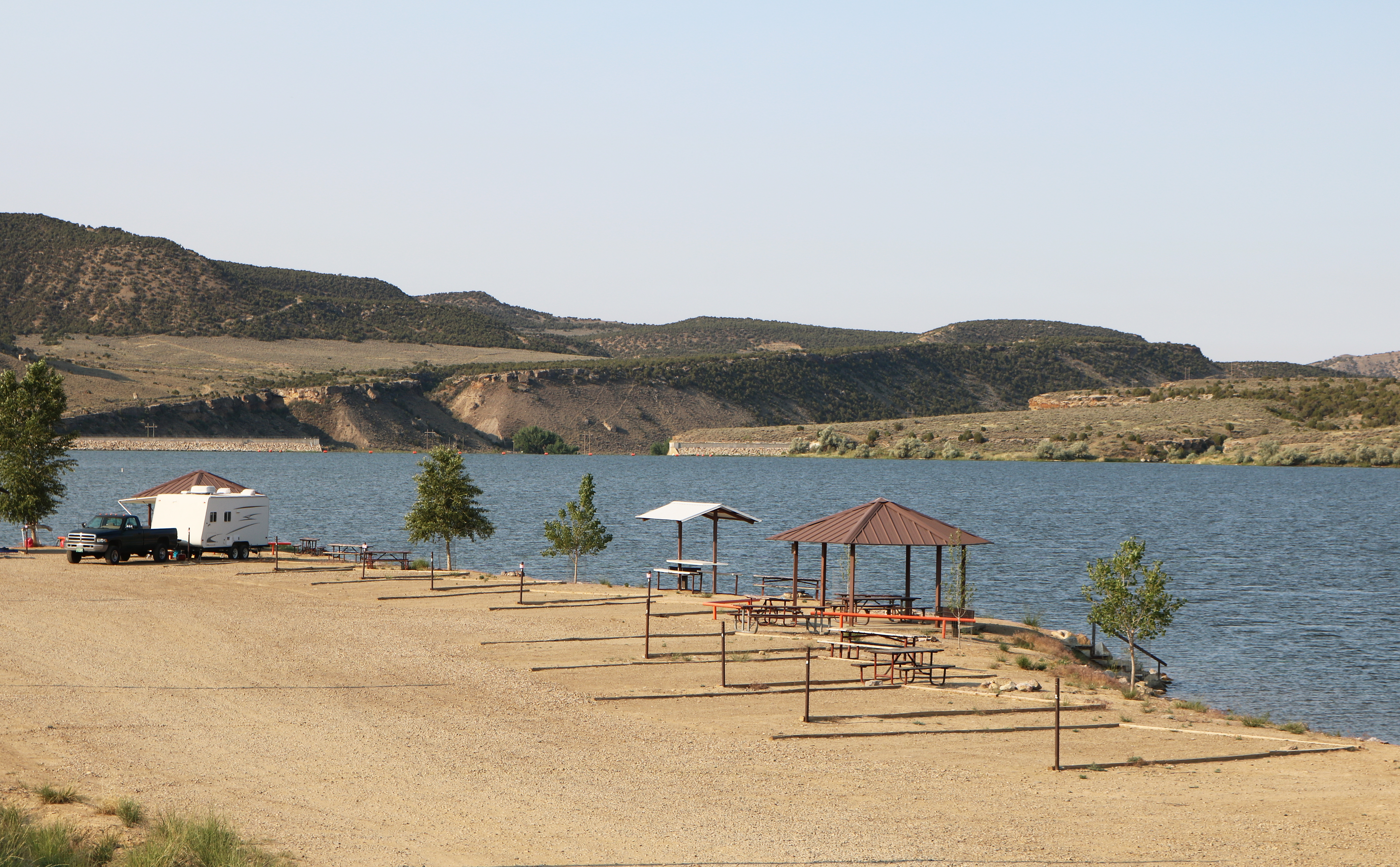
- Looking across the reservoir towards the dam

- Location in Colorado
- Location: Rio Blanco County, Colorado
- Coordinates: 40°07′01″N 108°42′29″W
- Type: reservoir
- Primary inflows: White River
- Primary outflows: White River
- Managing agency: Rio Blanco Water Conservancy District
- Built: 1984
- Surface area: 650 acres (260 ha)
- Water volume: 22,200 acre-feet (27,400,000 cubic meters)
- Surface elevation: 5,266 feet (1,605 meters)

Kenney Reservoir is located in Rio Blanco County, Colorado five mlies east of the town of Rangely along Colorado State Highway 64. The reservoir is owned and managed by the Rio Blanco Water Conservancy District.

== Dam ==
The dam, called Taylor Draw Dam, (National ID # CO02572) is an earthen dam, with a large center spillway, built in 1984. The dam was constructed to prevent flooding caused by ice dams on the White River, dams that would cause flooding along Main Street in Rangely.

The dam's height was increased in 1991 to allow for the addition of a hydroelectric power plant. The 2-megawatt plant began operation in 1993 and supplies electricity to the nearby area.

The dam and reservoir have a big problem with siltation. When it was built, the reservoir had a capacity of 13,800 acre-feet (17,000,000 cubic meters) of water and a surface area of 650 acres (260 ha), but because of the continuing siltation, the reservoir now has a capacity of 8,000 acre-feet (9,900,000 cubic meters) and a surface area of 335 acres (136 ha).
