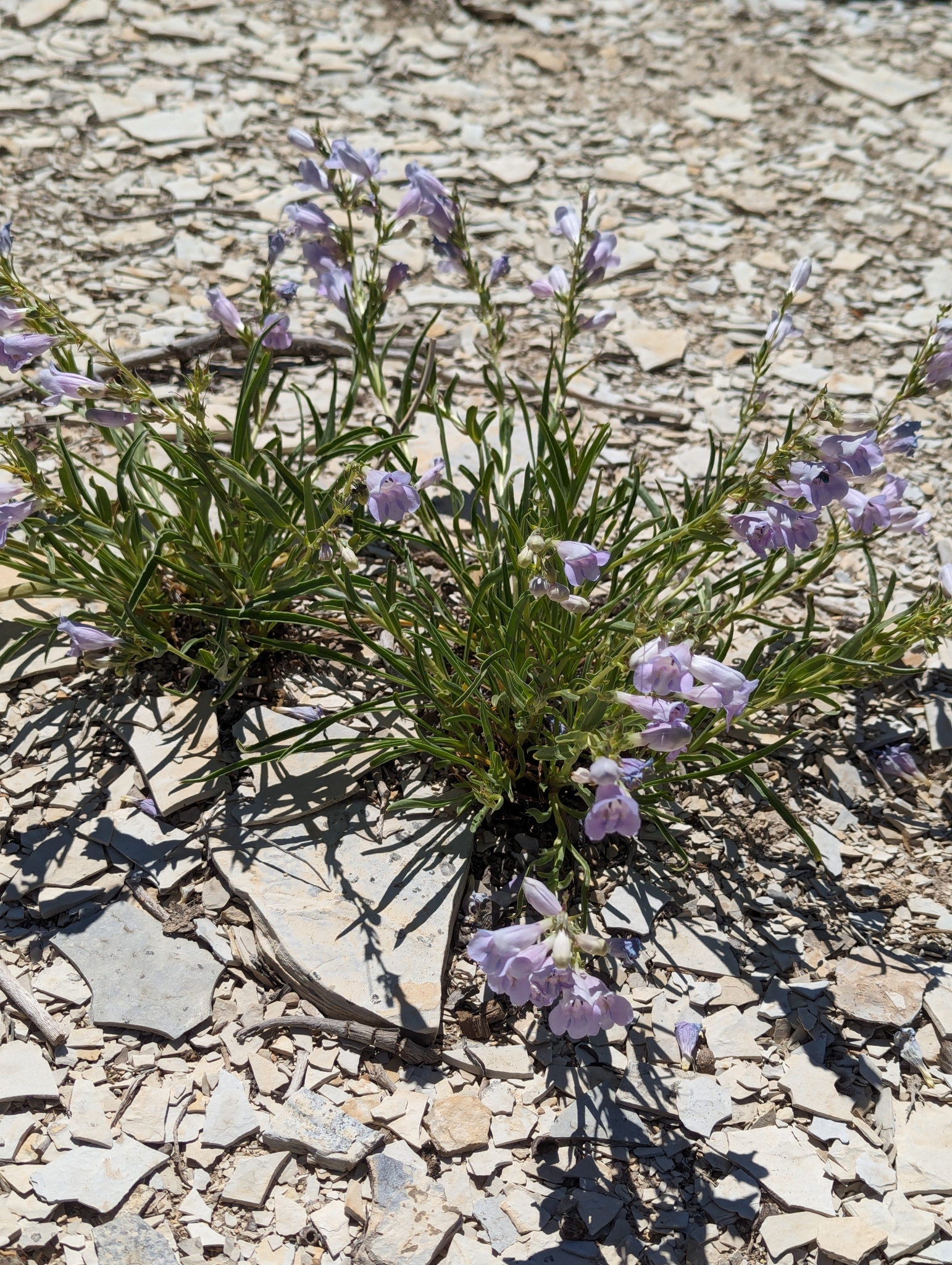
- Penstemon albifluvis on shale Rio Blanco County, Colorado

Scientific classification
- Kingdom: Plantae
- Clade: Tracheophytes
- Clade: Angiosperms
- Clade: Eudicots
- Clade: Asterids
- Order: Lamiales
- Family: Plantaginaceae
- Genus: Penstemon
- Species: P. albifluvis

Binomial name
- Penstemon albifluvis England, 1982

Synonyms
- Penstemon scariosus var. albifluvis (England) N.H.Holmgren (1984)

= Penstemon albifluvis =

Plant species in the plantain family

Penstemon albifluvis, the White River penstemon, is a disputed species or variety of Penstemon that grows in a small area in eastern Utah and western Colorado. It grows mainly on broken shale and rock formations in desert habitats. White River penstemon is very rare.

== Description ==
Penstemon albifluvis is a moderate sized herbaceous plant that usually grows between 15 and 45 centimeters tall, but may rarely be as short as 10 cm or as tall as 50 cm. Most often it has 5 to 20 stems that grow straight upwards or grow outwards a short distance before curving to grow upright, but occasionally it may have just one flowering stem. The stems sprout from a branched caudex, a persistent woody structure atop the plant's taproot.

Early in development Penstemon albifluvis will have basal leaves, ones that sprout directly from the caudex, but by the time of flowering they are seldom still present. The leaves on the flowering stems are hairless with edges that are either smooth or curley edges. The lower leaves are oblanceolate, shaped like a reversed spear head with the widest part past the middle of the leaf, and attached by a short stalk to the stem. Further up the leaves are attached directly to the stem and linear, narrower and more grass like, but often somewhat oblanceolate. Leaf size usually ranges from 4–10 cm long and 4–6 millimeters wide, though they may occasionally be as short as 2 cm, as long 12 cm, or as wide as 11 mm.

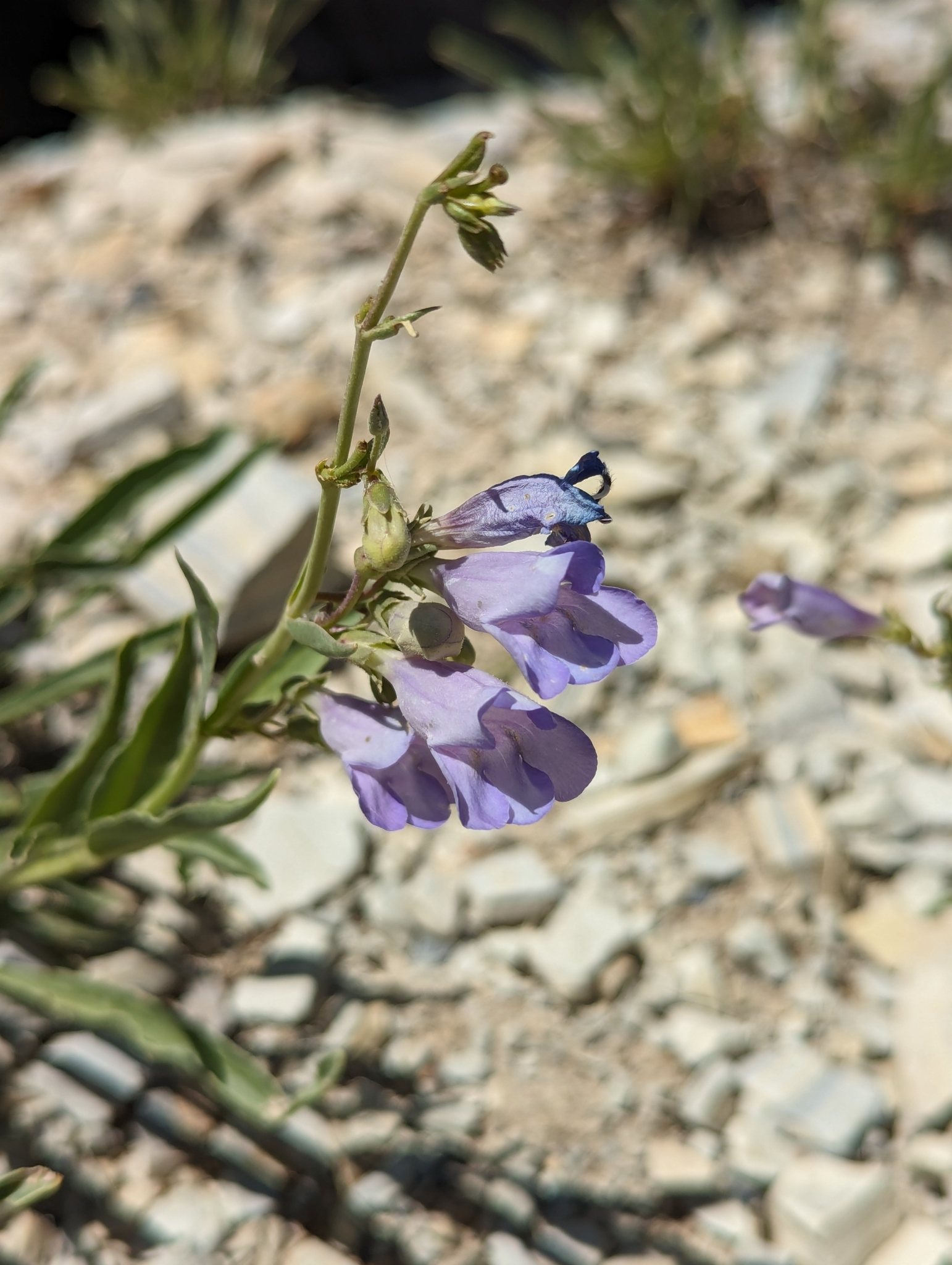
Side view of flower

The inflorescence is a thyrse, a stalk with groups of flowers where the main stem grows indeterminately. There are three to ten groups of flowers on each inflorescence, each group having multiple flowers attached on opposite sides of the stem. Two to four flowers attached to each side. The flowers are tubes with five lobes, each lobe 5–7.3 mm by 2.4–3 mm. The flower as a whole is 22–28 mm long and sparsely covered in glandular hairs on the outside, but may occasionally be as short as 18 mm. The flowers are pale lavender sometimes with light blue lobes, it is only rarely in shades of blue. The staminode is 9-10 mm long and entirely contained inside the 14–15 mm long floral tube. It is straight and thinly covered in short orange hairs. The four fertile stamens reach the opening of the tube. They bloom from late may through the month of June.

The seeds are about 2 mm in size and contained within wide egg shaped capsules, 8–11 mm.

== Taxonomy ==
Penstemon albifluvis was scientifically described and named by the botanist John Larry England in 1982. England had encountered the plant while working for the United States Bureau of Land Management. He found the type specimen on the North bank of White River approximately 1.6 kilometers upstream of the Ignatio bridge in Uintah County, Utah. In 1984 Noel Herman Holmgren published a description of the species as a variety of Penstemon scariosus, but as of 2024 it is an accepted species according to Plants of the World Online and World Flora Online. However, many sources including the Flora of North America list it as a subspecies. Though on the other hand, the botanist William Alfred Weber was of the opinion that it is more similar to Penstemon strictus. Genetic analysis of the similar Penstemon scariosus revealed that P. albifluvis is genetically distinct without the mixture of genes found between varieties of P. scariosus and along with its geographic isolation are why it was recognized as a species.

== Names ==
The species name, albifluvis, is a botanical Latin compound of albus and fluvis meaning White River for the location of its habitat in western Colorado and eastern Utah. In English it is also commonly called White River penstemon.

== Range and habitat ==
White River penstemon has a natural range of just two counties, Rio Blanco in western Colorado and the neighboring Uintah County in eastern Utah. It mostly grows from the White River southward to the East Tavaputs Plateau. The only documented Colorado location is on Raven Ridge near the boarder with Utah. It ranges in elevation from 1500–2200 meters. The total size of its range is between 100-250 square kilometers.

It grows with desert shrubs such as sagebrush, shadscale, or rabbitbrush, but also grows in open woodlands characterized by piñon pines, junipers, ponderosa pines, aspens, spruces, or firs. In Colorado it is only found outcrops of Green River Shale, largely barren of life.

=== Conservation ===
As a variety it was evaluated by NatureServe in 2022 and listed as critically imperiled (T1) at the global level. It is threatened by grazing and hydrocarbon development.

== See also ==
List of Penstemon species
