= South Fork White River =

River in the United States of America

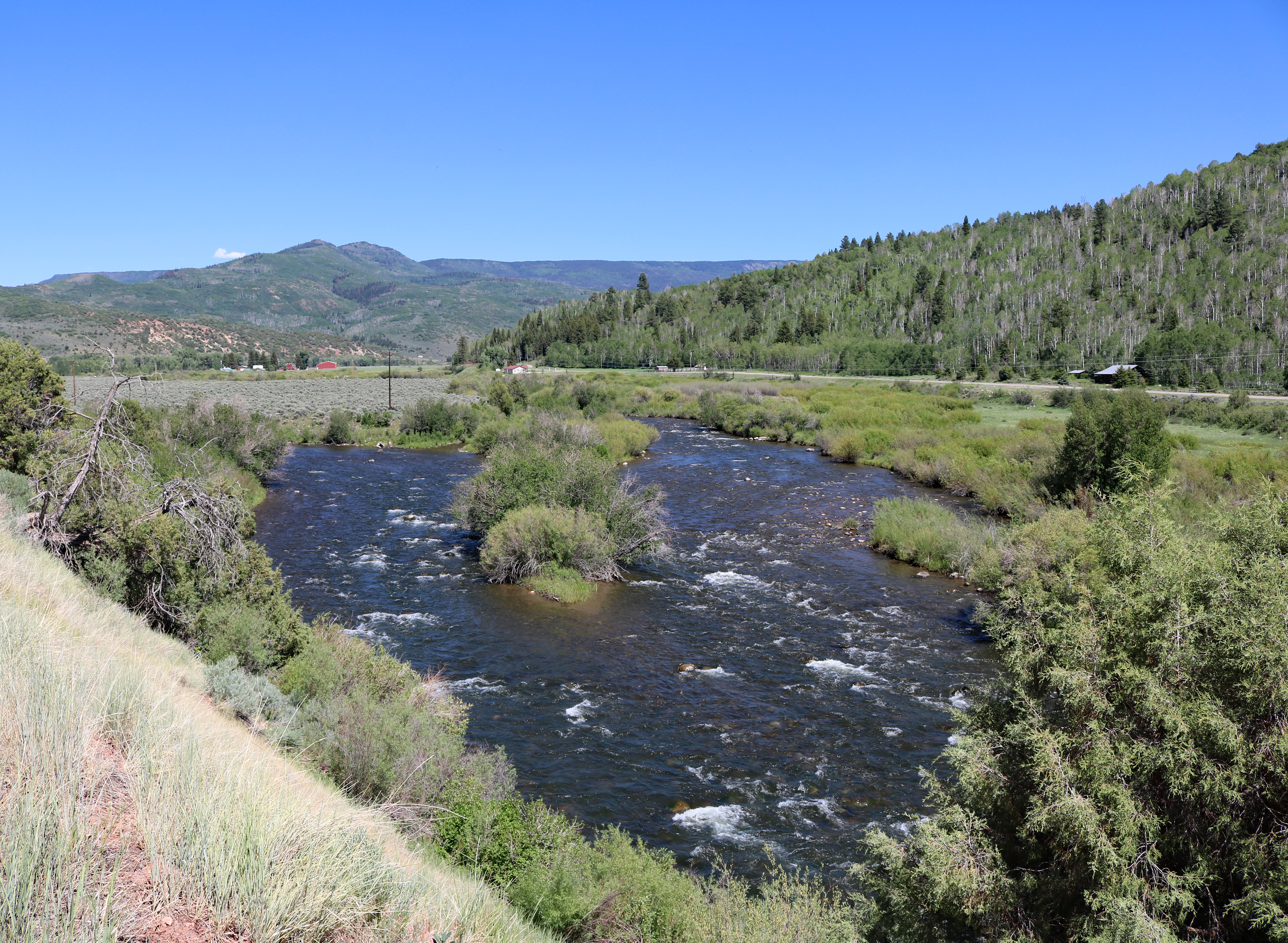
- The confluence of the South Fork (right) and the North Fork (left) and the White River headwaters

Physical characteristics
- Source
  - coordinates: 39°56′08″N 107°11′59″W
- Mouth
  - location: Confluence with North Fork White River
  - coordinates: 39°58′23″N 107°38′18″W
  - elevation: 6,932 ft (2,113 m)

Basin features
- Progression: White—Green—Colorado

The South Fork White River is a 38.6-mile-long (62.1 km) tributary of the White River. Its source is in the Flat Tops Wilderness Area of Garfield County, Colorado. It joins the North Fork White River in Rio Blanco County to form the White River.

== See also ==
- List of rivers of Colorado
- List of tributaries of the Colorado River
