= Dinosaur Diamond =

Scenic road in Utah and Colorado in the United States

Coordinates: 39.0703°N 108.5709°W

Dinosaur Diamond National Scenic Byway
- Dinosaur Diamond highlighted in red

Route information
- Length: 486 mi (782 km)
- Existed: 2002–present
- Component highways: US 191; US 40; SH 64; SH 139; I-70 / US 6 / US 50; SR-128

Major junctions
- East end: US 50 / SH 340 Grand Junction, Colorado
- West end: US 6 / US 191 Price, Utah

Location
- Country: United States
- States: Utah, Colorado
- Counties: UT: Carbon, Duchesne, Grand, Emery; CO: Moffat, Rio Blanco, Garfield, Mesa

Highway system
- Scenic Byways; National; National Forest; BLM; NPS
- Colorado State Highway System; Interstate; US; State; Scenic
- Utah State Highway System; Interstate; US; State; Minor; Scenic

The Dinosaur Diamond is a 486-mile (782 km) scenic and historic byway loop through the dinosaur fossil laden Uinta Basin of the U.S. states of Utah and Colorado. The byway comprises the following two National Scenic Byways:

- The 328-mile (528 km) Dinosaur Diamond Prehistoric Highway in Carbon, Duchesne, Emery, and Grand counties, Utah; and
- The 134-mile (216 km) Dinosaur Diamond National Scenic Byway in Garfield, Mesa, Moffat, and Rio Blanco counties, Colorado.

The highway forms a diamond-shaped loop with vertices at Moab, Helper, Vernal and Grand Junction.

Notable features along the Dinosaur Diamond include Dinosaur National Monument, the Flaming Gorge National Recreation Area, Canyonlands National Park, Arches National Park, Natural Bridges National Monument, Colorado National Monument, and several national forests.

The path of Interstate 70 (I‑70) in Colorado is derived from two previous highways, U.S. Highway 6 (US 6) and US 40. US 40 was an original piece of the U.S. Highway system commissioned in 1926. The portion now numbered US 6 came about in 1937 when the route over Vail Pass was paved. The first route through the path of I-70 in Utah was the Old Spanish Trail, a trade route between Santa Fe, New Mexico, and Los Angeles, California. The trail was in common use before the Mexican–American War in 1848.

== Route description ==
=== Colorado ===
The following Colorado routes are included in the Colorado portion of the Dinosaur Diamond Scenic and Historic Byway:

- I-70 between Grand Junction and the Utah state line. (I-70 runs concurrently with US 6 and US 50 in this area)
- US 40 between Dinosaur and the Utah state line
- SH 64 between Dinosaur and Rangely
- SH 139 between Fruita and Rangely

The easternmost starting point of the Dinosaur Diamond (DD) begins in Grand Junction, Colorado, on I-70. In the vicinity of Grand Junction are the White River, Uncompahgre, and Grand Mesa National Forests. Other notable features nearby include the Powderhorn Resort, and the geologic features of Book Cliffs and Grand Mesa.

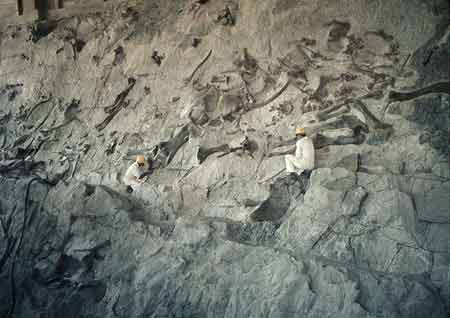
Workers extracting dinosaur bones at Dinosaur National Monument

Traveling about 10 miles (16 km) westbound on I-70 will lead to Fruita, a small town within view of the Colorado National Monument, which features numerous scenic hiking trails. From the trails, one may view attractions such as the Book Cliffs and Coke Ovens overlooks, and unique rock formations such as Independence Monument and the "Kissing Couple". Fruita is also the home of Mike the Headless Chicken, and hosts an annual festival in his honor every May. A small statue dedicated to Mike can also be seen in the town.

Just west of Fruita, the byway turns north onto SH-139, traveling 78 miles (126 km) to the next town of Rangely, and traversing the Douglas Pass. Nearby attractions include the Rangely Outdoor Museum and the Cañon Pintado ("painted canyon") Historic District petroglyphs, which is listed on the National Register of Historic Places.

The byway continues 18 miles (29 km) northwest on SH-64, to the small town of Dinosaur. Nearby Dinosaur is the "crown jewel" of the DD, the Dinosaur National Monument, which claims to be the most productive Jurassic Period dinosaur quarry in the world. The monument includes a walkway where visitors can view a sandstone wall embedded with over 2,000 dinosaur bones, and watch paleontologists chip away the sandstone to expose the fossilized dinosaur bones. Visitors can also see the preparation laboratory where dinosaur fossils are cleaned and preserved.

Upon leaving Dinosaur, the DD continues west on US 40 and crosses the border into Utah.

=== Utah ===
The Utah portion of the Dinosaur Diamond Prehistoric Highway is routed along these highways:

- I-70 between Colorado state line and Cisco, again from Crescent Junction to Green River (I-70 runs concurrently with US 6 and US 50 in this area)
- US 6 from Green River to Helper
- US 40 from Vernal to Colorado state line
- US 191 from Moab to Vernal
- SR-128 from Cisco to Moab

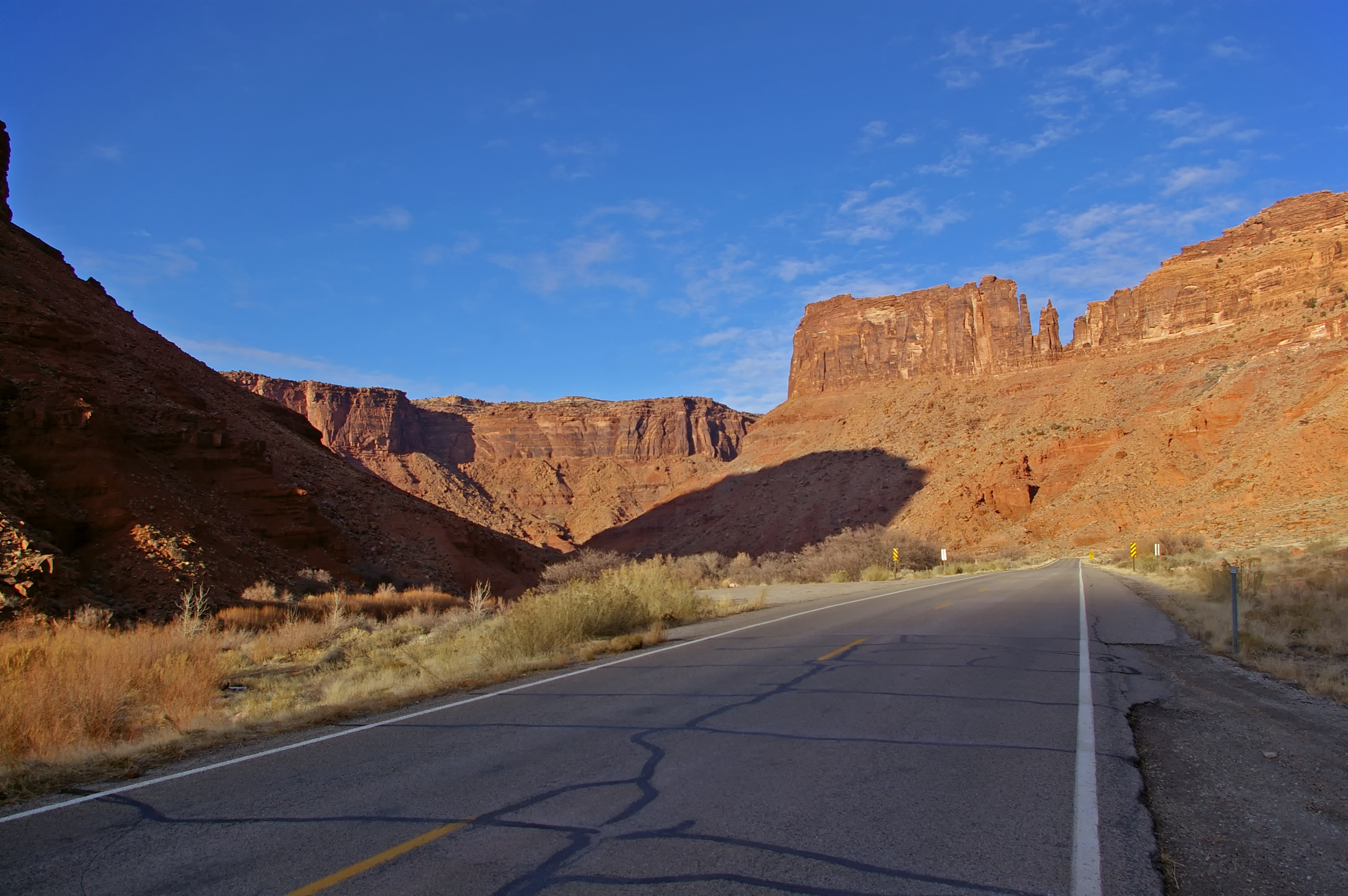
SR-128, one of the highways forming the Dinosaur Diamond Prehistoric Byway

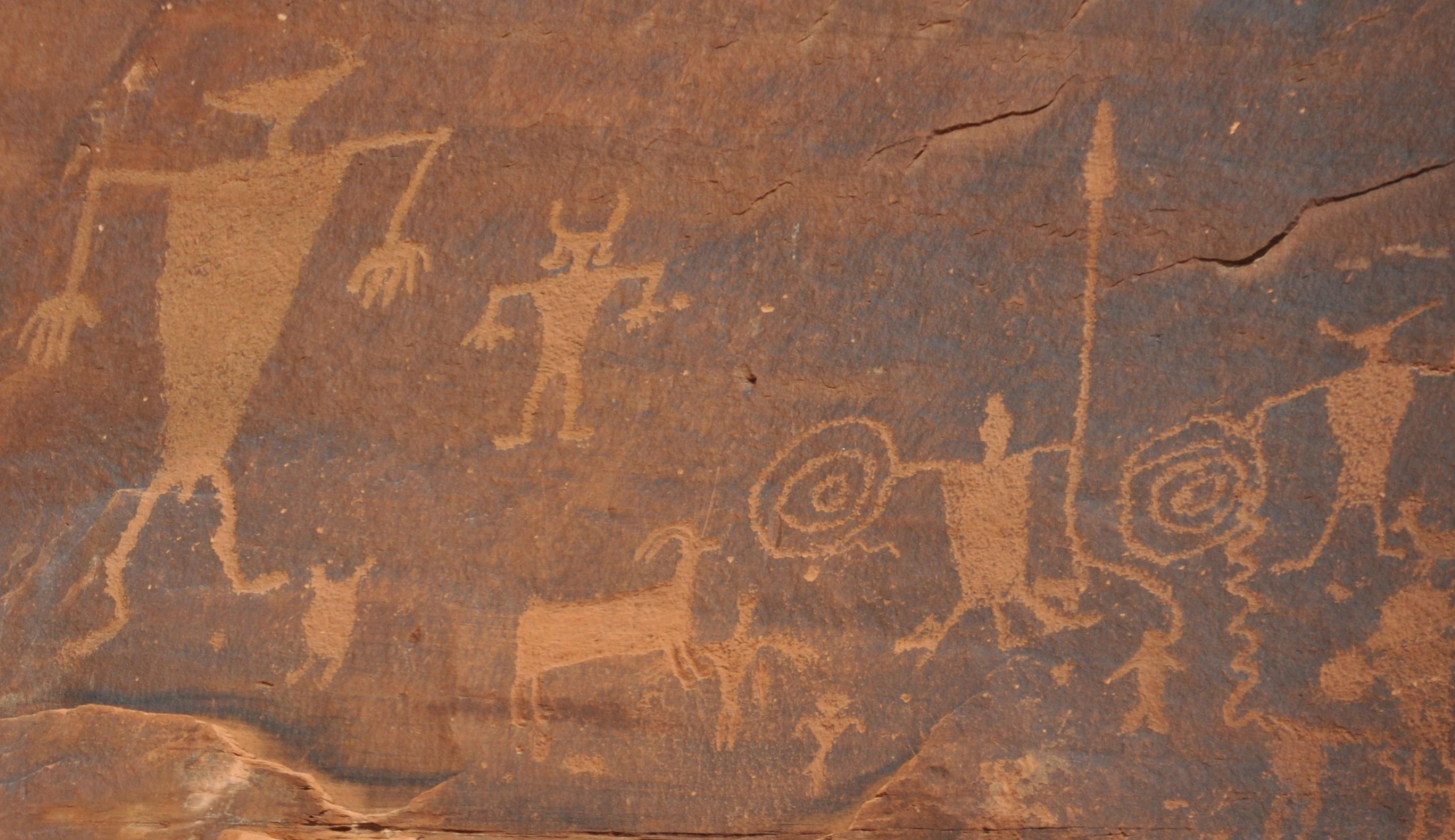
Potash Road Petroglyphs, on Utah State Route 279 near Moab

Traveling 34 miles (55 km) west of Dinosaur, Colorado, the Dinosaur Diamond encounters the small city of Vernal, Utah. Vernal borders the western end of the Dinosaur National Monument; other notable attractions nearby include Steinaker State Park, Red Fleet State Park, Flaming Gorge National Recreation Area, and the Ashley National Forest.

Continuing along the Dinosaur Diamond, US 40 and US 191 converge within Vernal, heading west for 30 miles (48 km) to the city of Roosevelt. Roosevelt is located on the edge of the Uintah and Ouray Indian Reservation. Heading 29 miles (47 km) to the west is the county seat of Duchesne, located within the reservation. Nearby Duchesne are Fred Hayes State Park at Starvation and Kings Peak (the highest point in Utah), which is part of the Uinta Mountain range. The Uinta Mountains are one of the few mountain ranges in the contiguous United States which run east–west, and are the highest range to do so.

Within Duchesne, US 40 and US 191 diverge, and the DD continues 55 miles (89 km) south along US 191 over an unnamed mountain pass, through the small town of Helper, and into the larger city of Price. The numerous attractions surrounding Price include College of Eastern Utah Prehistoric Museum, Manti-La Sal National Forest, Huntington Lake State Park, Scofield State Park, and Ninemile Canyon which features numerous petroglyphs. Also nearby is the Cleveland-Lloyd Dinosaur Quarry, a prehistoric mud trap which claims to be the densest concentration of Jurassic dinosaur fossils in the world.

Traveling 63 miles (101 km) southeast along US 191, the DD encounters the city of Green River. Notable features surrounding Green River include the San Rafael Swell, Green River State Park, and Goblin Valley State Park. Also nearby is Crystal Geyser, a rare (but man-made) cold water geyser caused by the expansion of carbonized "soda pop" water within. Within Green River, US 191 converges with I-70 for a short while and diverges again, south towards the city of Moab, 55 miles (89 km) from Green River.

Just south of the junction of US 191 and SR-128, the city of Moab features a number of nearby attractions. Arches National Park, Canyonlands National Park, Dead Horse Point State Park, and the Newspaper Rock and Potash Road petroglyphs.

Leaving Moab, the DD continues north along SR-128 to its terminus with I-70 in Cisco. Traveling east along I-70, before completing the "diamond" back in Grand Junction, Colorado.

== History ==
The segment within Colorado was designated the Dinosaur Diamond Scenic and Historic Byway by the Colorado Transportation Commission in 1997. The segment within Utah was designated the Dinosaur Diamond Prehistoric Highway by the Utah State Legislature in 1998. The highway was approved as a National Scenic Byway in 2002.

National Scenic Byways must go through a nomination procedure, and must already be designated as a state scenic byway in order to be nominated (However, roads that meet all criteria and requirements for national designation but not state or designation criteria may be considered for national designation on a case-by-case basis).

To be considered for designation "a road or highway must significantly meet at least one of the six scenic byways intrinsic qualities". The qualities are scenic, natural, historic, cultural, archeological, or recreational. A "corridor management plan" must also be developed, with community involvement, and the plan "should provide for the conservation and enhancement of the byway's intrinsic qualities as well as the promotion of tourism and economic development". The final step is when the highway (or highways) is approved for designation by the Secretary of Transportation.

=== Colorado history ===
The path of I-70 in Colorado is derived from two previous highways, US 6 and US 40. US 40 was an original piece of the U.S. Highway system commissioned in 1926. The portion now numbered US 6 came about in 1937 when the route over Vail Pass was paved. A portion of this route was also numbered US 24 at the time.

In the 1920s, SH-139 was an unimproved road from US 6 at Fruita north to SH-64 in Rangely.

=== Utah history ===
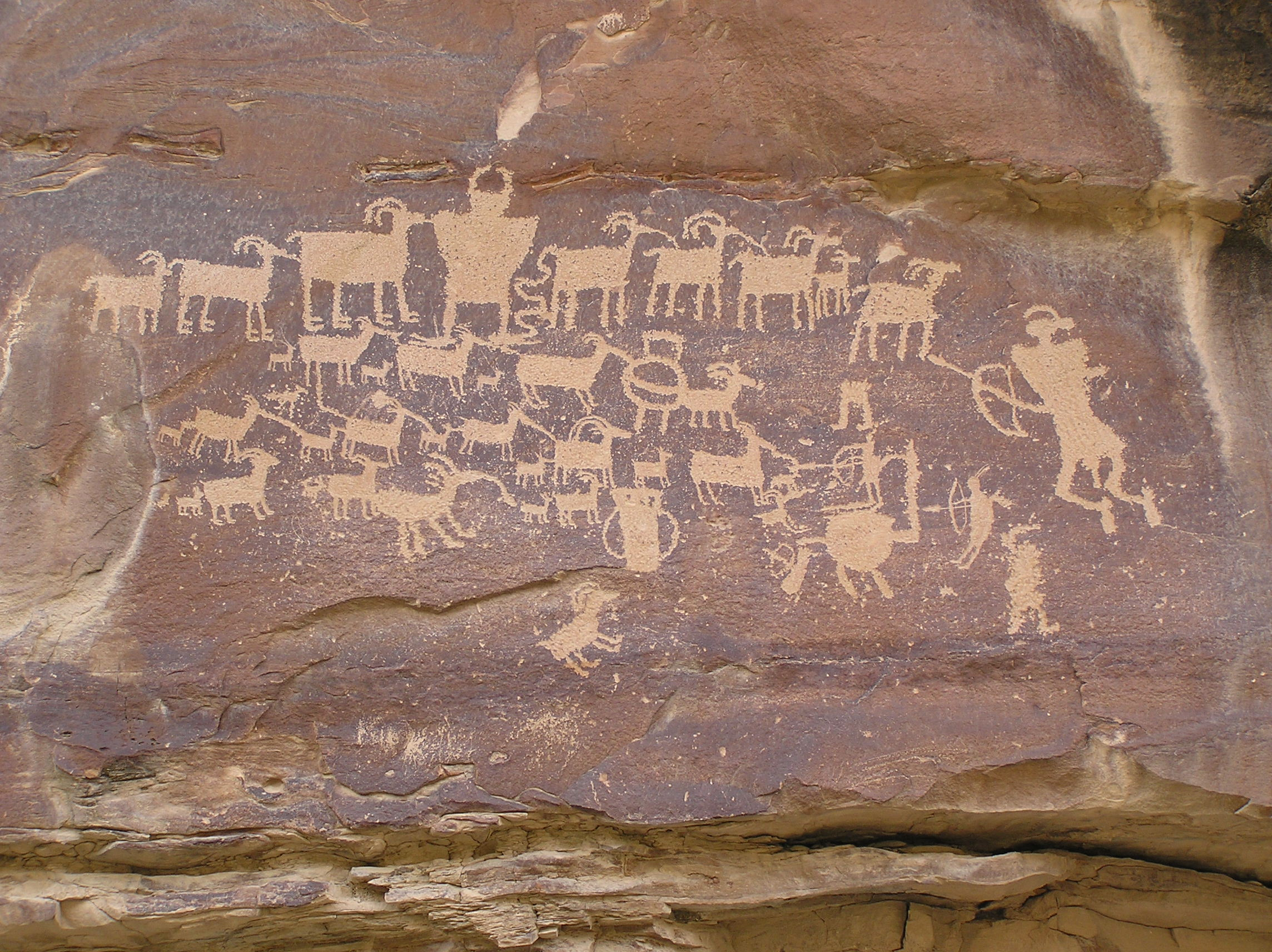
Petroglyphs inside Ninemile Canyon

The first route through this portion of Utah was the Old Spanish Trail, a trade route between Santa Fe, New Mexico and Los Angeles, California. The trail was in common use before the Mexican–American War in 1848. Although the trail serves a different route than I-70, they were both intended to connect southern California with points further east. I-70 generally parallels the route of the Old Spanish Trail west of Crescent Junction.

The Utah State Road Commission took over US 40 from Kimball Junction to Colorado in 1910 and 1911, and assigned the SR-6 designation to this route by the mid-1920s. In late 1926, the American Association of State Highway Officials (AASHO) assigned the designation of US 40 to this cross-state route, consisting of most of SR-4 and all of SR-6. (The SR-6 designation remained until the 1977 renumbering; SR-4 became SR-2 in 1962 and was eliminated in favor of I-80 in 1977.)

The road connecting Colton on SR-8 (US 50, now US 6) with SR-6 (US 40) in Duchesne became a state highway in 1910. The southwest end was moved from Colton to Castle Gate in 1912, and in 1927 it was numbered State Route 33. Few changes were made to the roadway, and in 1981 it became part of US 191.

Access between Moab and Castle Valley was originally via a pack trail called the Heavenly Stairway. This trail, named for a dramatic descent of over 1,000 feet (300 m), was described as beautiful, but difficult to navigate. Isolated from Utah's population centers, this area depended on Grand Junction and other cities in Colorado for both everyday supplies and a market for agricultural products. Moab residents pushed for a road to be built along the riverbank. By 1902, the trail was replaced with a toll road, called King's Toll Road, after Samuel King. King was an early settler who also operated the toll ferry used prior to the construction of the Dewey Bridge. Rocks inscribed with "Kings Toll Road" can still be found along the roadway. While the road did improve travel, it was not built high enough above the river level and was often flooded.

== Gallery ==
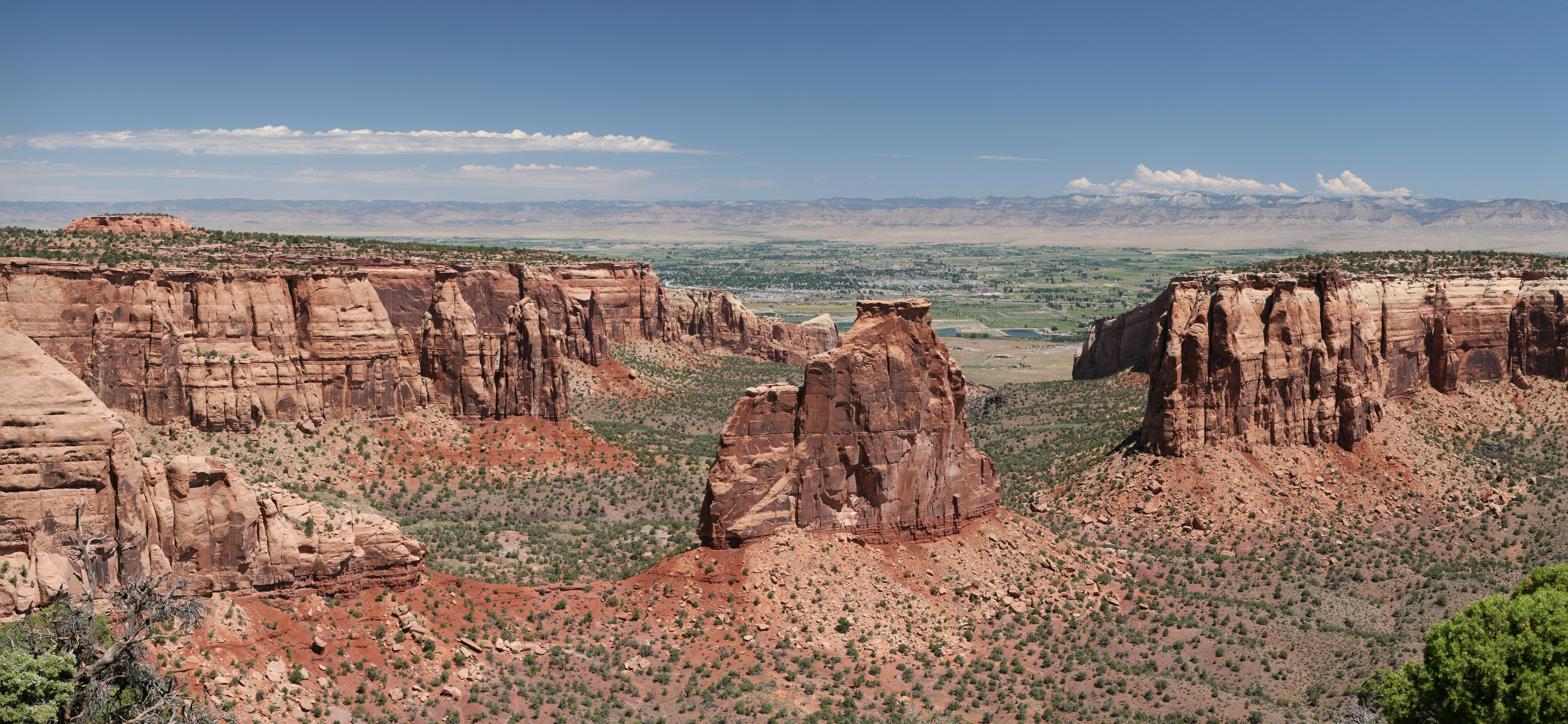
Independence Monument in Colorado National Monument

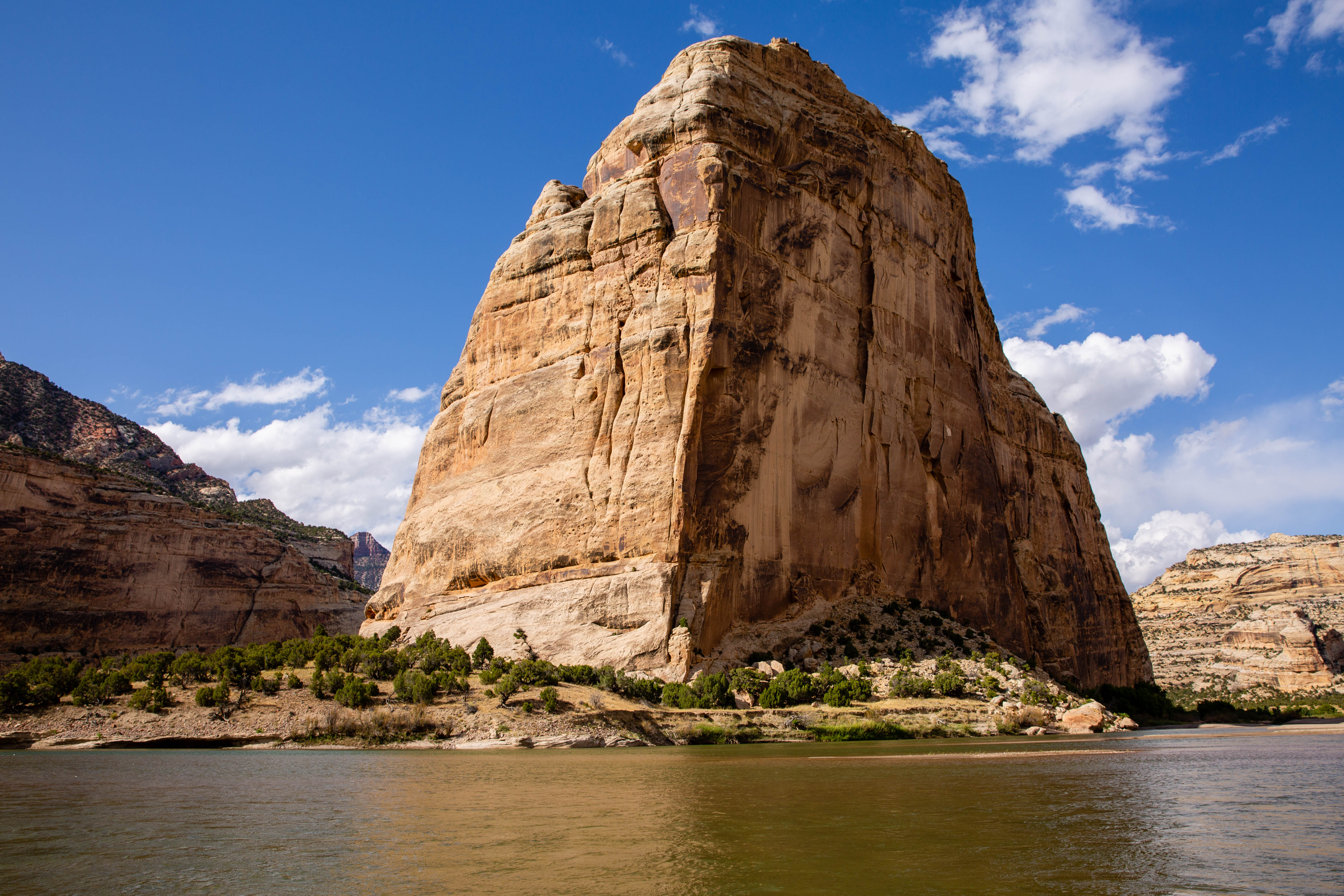
Steamboat Rock in Dinosaur National Monument

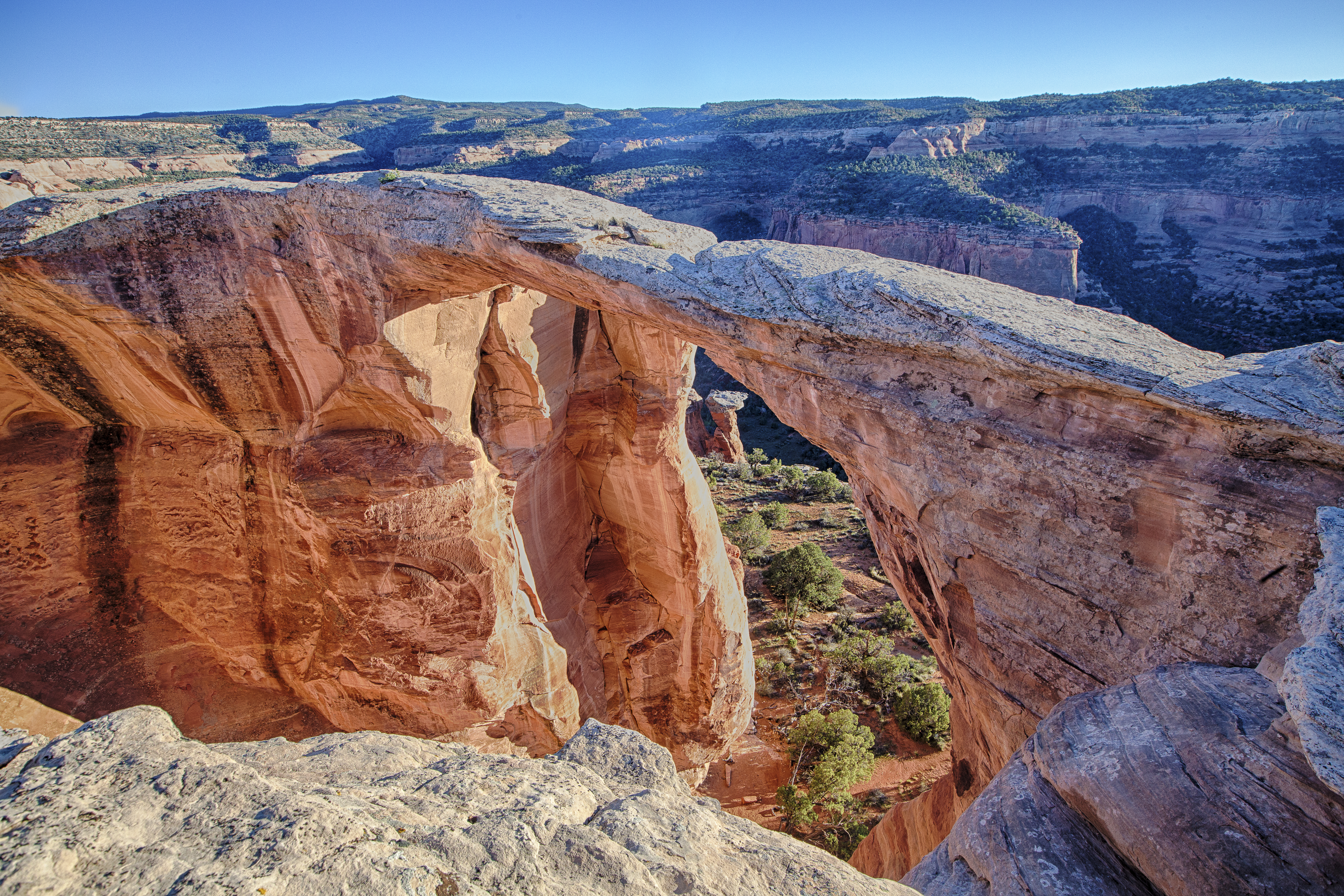
McInnis Canyons National Conservation Area

== See also ==
- List of Colorado Scenic and Historic Byways
- List of Utah Scenic Byways
- Scenic byways in the United States
