= Colorow Mountain =

Mountain summit in Colorado, US

- Location within Colorado

Highest point
- Elevation: 7,867 ft (2,398 m)
- Coordinates: 40°10′55.89″N 108°10′44.31″W

Naming
- Etymology: Colorow, Ute chief

Geography
- Location: Rio Blanco County, Colorado

Colorow Mountain is a summit in the Indian Valley area in Rio Blanco County, Colorado. The Colorow Mountain State Wildlife Area is located on the mountain.

The Colorow Mountain State Wildlife Area is located near White River City and is north of Rio Blanco Lake and State Highway 64. There is camping, hunting, hiking, horseback riding, and wildlife viewing on the 1500-acre park. It has access to some Bureau of Land Management areas north of the wildlife area. The wildlife area opened in 2013 following a land swap between ExxonMobil and Colorado Parks and Wildlife to protect wildlife.
