= Rio Blanco Lake State Wildlife Area =

Protected area in Colorado, United States

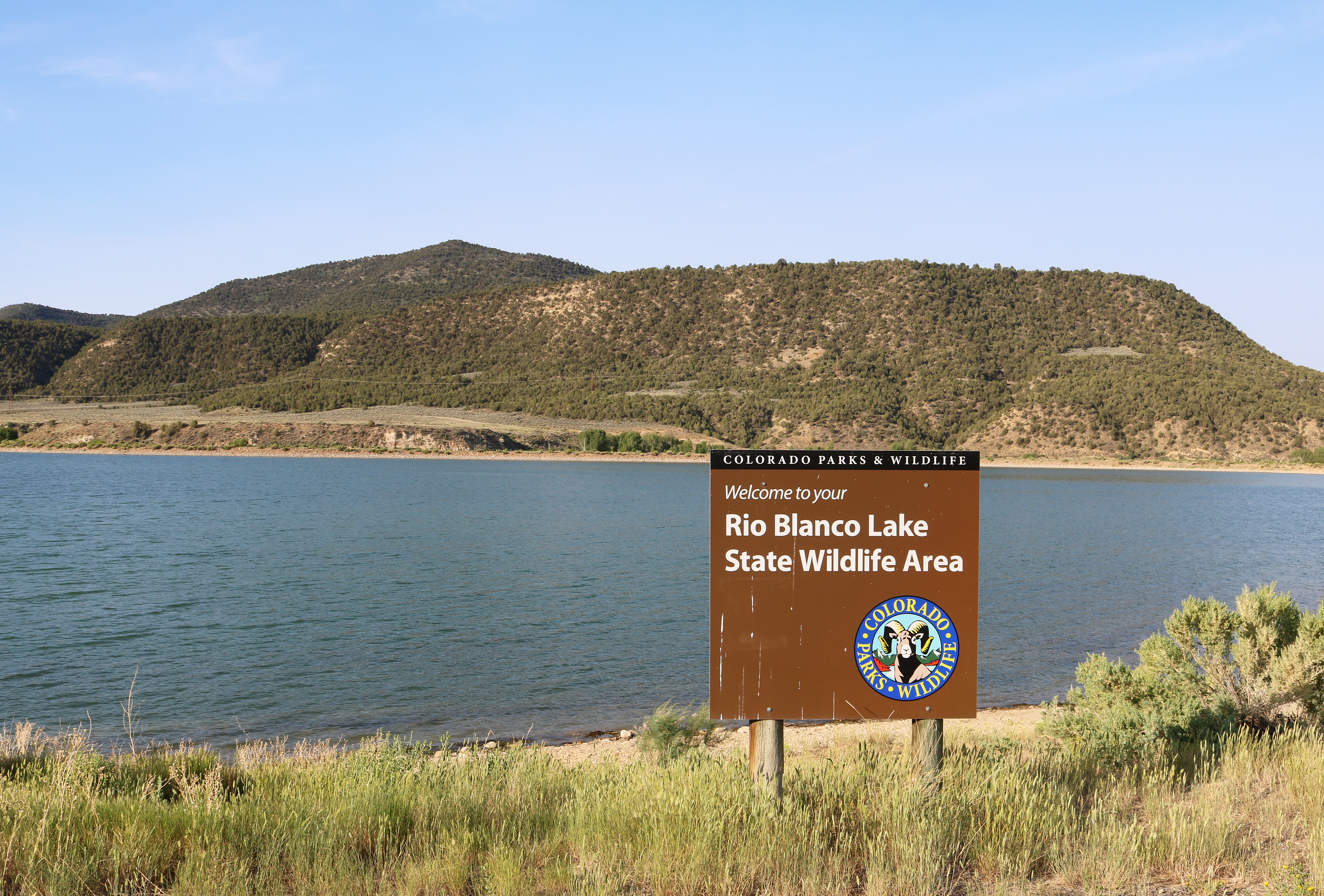
- The area in 2021

- Location within Colorado
- Location: White River City, Rio Blanco County, Colorado
- Nearest city: Meeker, Colorado
- Coordinates: 40°5′15.49″N 108°12′28.49″W

Rio Blanco Lake State Wildlife Area, including the Rio Blanco Lake reservoir, is recreational area operated by the Colorado Parks and Wildlife. It is located in White River City in Rio Blanco County, Colorado. Located on 383 acres, recreational activities include fishing and camping. Facilities include a boat ramp and restrooms.

== See also ==
- Colorow Mountain State Wilderness Area
