= Spring Cave =

Cave in Colorado, United States

Coordinates: 39°51′36″N 107°32′18″W

Spring Cave is a large, not completely explored cave in Colorado in the White River National Forest, in the South Fork Valley of the White River, that has been largely cut out by an underground river running through it. It contains a lake several hundred meters inside as well as several caverns only accessible through underwater diving. The cave is free to explore.

== Cave layout ==
There are two entrances to the cave, both at the end of Spring Cave Trail. Most visitors prefer the nearest entrance, an over-two-meter-high passageway. From there one descends through several rooms leading to a permanent ladder, followed by more rooms leading to the river. It is the largest river inside a cave in Colorado. The level of the river rises and falls throughout the year, and can even rise to the level of the cave entrance on rare occasions.

There are several series of rooms above and past the river, a few of which lead to an underground lake. Past the lake lie several sumps which must be passed through diving. The full extent of the cavern and underground waterways in it is still not completely known.

== Cave closure ==
Spring Cave was closed to public access or use due to white nose syndrome, a fungal disease that is devastating bat populations in the United States and Canada. Spring Cave may now be visited April 16 through August 14, by persons who have registered and observed decontamination procedures. It is closed August 15 - April 15.
