= Colorado State Highway 64 =

State highway in Colorado, United States

State Highway 64
- SH 64 highlighted in red

Route information
- Maintained by CDOT
- Length: 73.70 mi (118.61 km)

Major junctions
- West end: US 40 in Dinosaur
- SH 139 near Rangely
- East end: SH 13 near Meeker

Location
- Country: United States
- State: Colorado
- Counties: Moffat, Rio Blanco

Highway system
- Colorado State Highway System; Interstate; US; State; Scenic
← SH 63	→ SH 65

State Highway 64 (SH 64) is a 74-mile-long (119 km) two-lane state highway connecting the towns of Dinosaur and Meeker in the western part of the U.S. state of Colorado. It is located in both Moffat and Rio Blanco counties. The western end of SH 64 is part of the Dinosaur Diamond Scenic Byway, while the eastern end is a junction with SH 13 near Meeker, Colorado. Its largest amount of traffic is 6600 near Rangely. It is classified as a Minor Rural Highway by the Colorado Department of Transportation.

== Route description ==
The route begins at a junction with US 40 in Dinosaur where it is named Stegosaurus Freeway (despite the fact it is not a freeway), following the tradition of naming the roads in Dinosaur after names of dinosaurs. After passing 8th Street and exiting the town, SH 64 continues on in the Colorado Plateau bearing south-southeast as Dinosaur Diamond Prehistoric Highway, crossing into Rio Blanco after another mile. About 4.2 miles (6.8 km) after it enters Rio Blanco County, SH 64 curves to the east and starts heading southeast to Rangely. Once past Rangely, it bends northeast to bisect the former townsite of Angora. From there, it bends back southeast following the White River valley through White River City, situated next to Rio Blanco Lake. It continues until it reaches a junction with SH 13 about 3 miles (4.8 km) away from Meeker.

== History ==
SH 64 was originally built in the 1920s. At that time, the highway started from south of Dinosaur and went west into Utah, but it was changed in the middle of the 1940s. The route of the highway shifted several times over the next two decades. In 1939, a spur line was constructed to continue southwest of Meeker. In 1946, the western end was moved from south of Dinosaur to US 40, which was a route already situated within Dinosaur (at that time called Sandy Springs). About a decade later, the spur line built in 1939 was eliminated. The following year, all of SH 64 was paved. There have been no other construction developments on the highway since then.

== Major intersections ==
County	Location	mi	km	Destinations	Notes
Moffat	Dinosaur	0.00	0.00	US 40 – Vernal, Craig	Western terminus
Rio Blanco	Rangely	19.79	31.85	SH 139 south – Loma, Grand Junction	Northern terminus of SH 139
Rio Blanco	Meeker	73.70	118.61	SH 13 – Meeker, Rifle	Eastern terminus
1.000 mi = 1.609 km; 1.000 km = 0.621 mi

== See also ==
- List of state highways in Colorado
