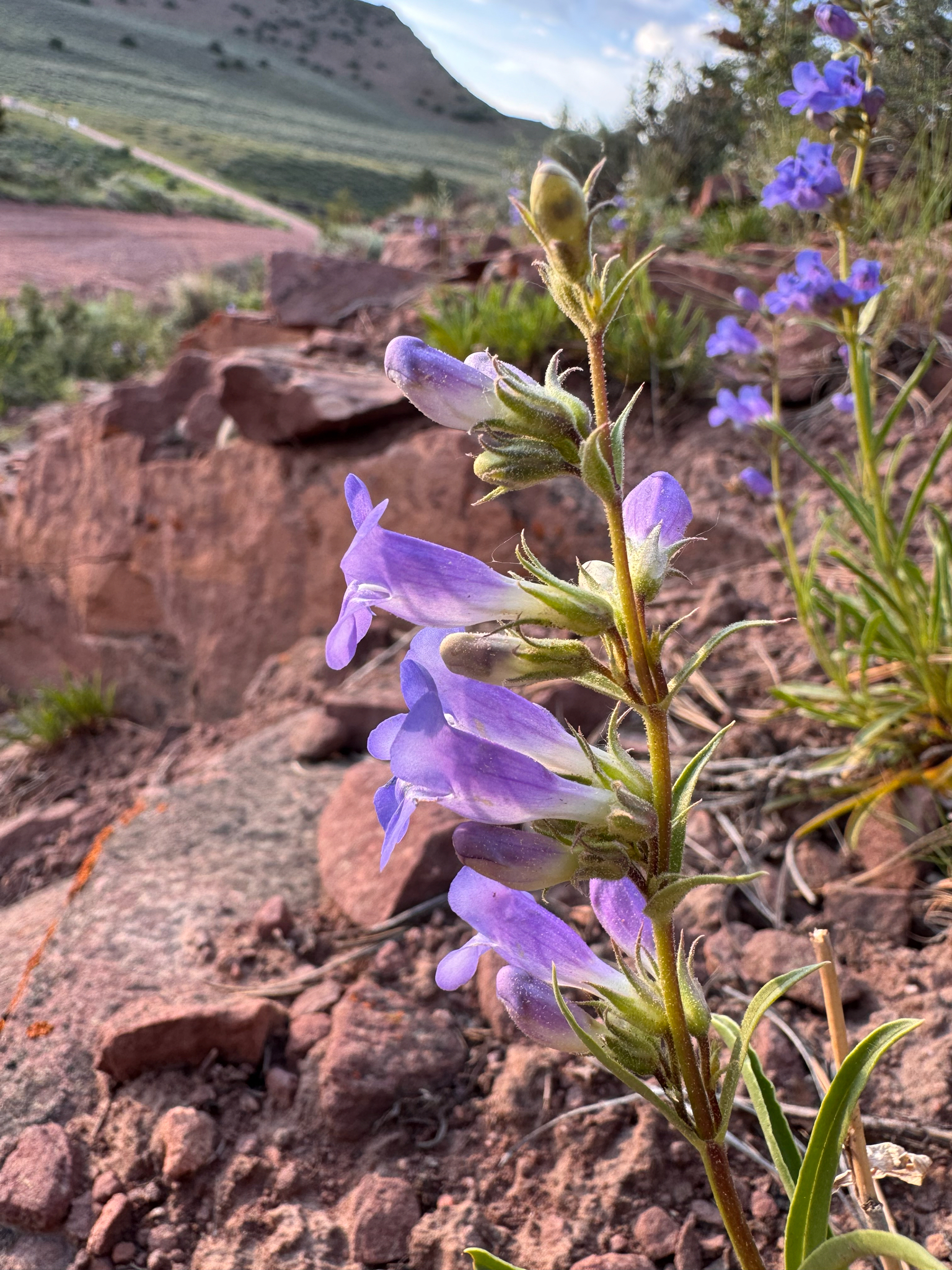
- var. cyanomontanus in Flaming Gorge National Recreation Area

Conservation status
- Apparently Secure (NatureServe)

Scientific classification
- Kingdom: Plantae
- Clade: Embryophytes
- Clade: Tracheophytes
- Clade: Spermatophytes
- Clade: Angiosperms
- Clade: Eudicots
- Clade: Asterids
- Order: Lamiales
- Family: Plantaginaceae
- Genus: Penstemon
- Species: P. scariosus

Binomial name
- Penstemon scariosus Pennell

Varieties
- P. s. var. cyanomontanus; P. s. var. jolynniae; P. s. var. scariosus

Synonyms
- Penstemon garrettii

= Penstemon scariosus =

Plant species in the veronica family

Penstemon scariosus is a species of flowering plant in the veronica family known by the common name plateau penstemon. It is native to Colorado, Utah, and Wyoming in the United States. The rare White River penstemon (Penstemon albifluvis) has been and is still listed as a variety of this species by some botanical sources.

== Description ==
Plateau penstemons are herbaceous plants that grow 8 to 63 centimeters (3 to 25 in) tall, but more typically are 16–50 cm (6.3–19.7 in). Usually mature plants have multiple stems, but occasionally they will have just one, growing from a basal crown. Normally the stems are erect or ascending, grow straight upwards or outwards slightly before curving to grow upwards, but rarely they grow along the ground. They are hairless unless they have a few glandular hairs at the top of the inflorescences.

If White River penstemon is not considered a variety then it has persisting basal leaves, ones that grow directly from the base of the plant, as well as leaves attached to opposite sides of its stems. The lower leaves measure 1.8 to 18 cm long, though usually longer than 3.5 cm. Their width is just 0.3–2.4 cm. They are spatulate, oblanceolate, linear-oblanceolate to linear-elliptic; that is shaped like a spoon with a wide rounded portion past the midpoint, like a reversed spear head, or narrow versions of these shapes more like a blade of grass. They often have flowerless shoots that develop into flowering stems in the following year. There can be three to six pairs of leaves attached to a flowering stem.

The inflorescence usually has two to ten groups of flowers above each pair of bracts, though occasionally a stem may have eleven. Each group will have two to twelve flowers, though usually no more than eight. Though attached to opposite sides, all the flowers face in one direction away from the stem. The petals are united in a funnel shaped tube that opens to a mouth with two lips and is 17–34 millimeters long. They are blue or blue-lavender in color. The outer pair extends out of the flower's mouth slightly while the inner pair does not. The staminode reaches the floral mouth or extends out slightly and is covered in golden to pale straw-colored hairs towards its end.

The fruit is a capsule that is 7–15 mm long. Its width is at least 5 mm.

== Taxonomy ==
The botanist Francis W. Pennell scientifically described and named Penstemon scariosus in 1920. He classified the species in the genus Penstemon which is in turn part of the family Plantaginaceae. According to Plants of the World Online (POWO) it has three varieties. However, Penstemon albifluvis is considered a variety of Penstemon scariosus by the USDA Natural Resources Conservation Service (NRCS) though it is a species according to POWO.

- Penstemon scariosus var. cyanomontanus
  This variety was described by Elizabeth Chase Neese (1934-2008) in 1986 and it grows in northwestern Colorado, Utah, and southern Wyoming. The only specific location listed for it by the NRCS is in Uintah County, Utah. In Colorado it is known from nine locations near the Utah border in Moffat County. It has also been collected from southern areas of Wyoming in Uinta County and southwestern Sweetwater County.
- Penstemon scariosus var. jolynniae
  This variety was described by Mikel R. Stevens and Robert L. Johnson in 2022 and it is endemic to the state of Utah. It was named for JoLynn Johnstun Stevens, the wife of one of the authors who also spotted the first specimen collected. It grows from the southern parts of the Duchesne River watershed in Duchesne County to the eastern parts of Wasatch County in the drainage of Currant Creek. On average it is taller than other varieties, reaching 19–63 cm (7–25 in) tall.
- Penstemon scariosus var. scariosus
  The autonymic variety is also limited to growing in just Utah. It also has two heterotypic synonyms, Penstemon garrettii which was also described by Pennell in 1920 and Penstemon scariosus var. garrettii, a reclassification of the species name by Noel H. Holmgren in 1984. Variety garrettii is accepted by the NRCS.

=== Names ===
The species name, scariosus, is Botanical Latin meaning "thin membranous texture", a reference to the plant's sepals. Penstemon scariosus is known by the common name plateau penstemon. It is also called the White River penstemon, however this name is applied to the disputed Penstemon albifluvis which has a Botanical Latin name meaning "White River".

== Cultivation ==
Plateau penstemon is occasionally grown in rock gardens and by penstemon enthusiasts. It is most suited for gardens in more cooler climates. The seeds require a long period of as much as 16 weeks of cold-moist stratification. Plants can also be maintained by being divided after the end of flowering when they form new shoots. The crown is cut apart so that each new shoot has a section of root and then replanted.
