= Piceance Creek =

Creek in Garfield and Rio Blanco counties in Colorado, United States

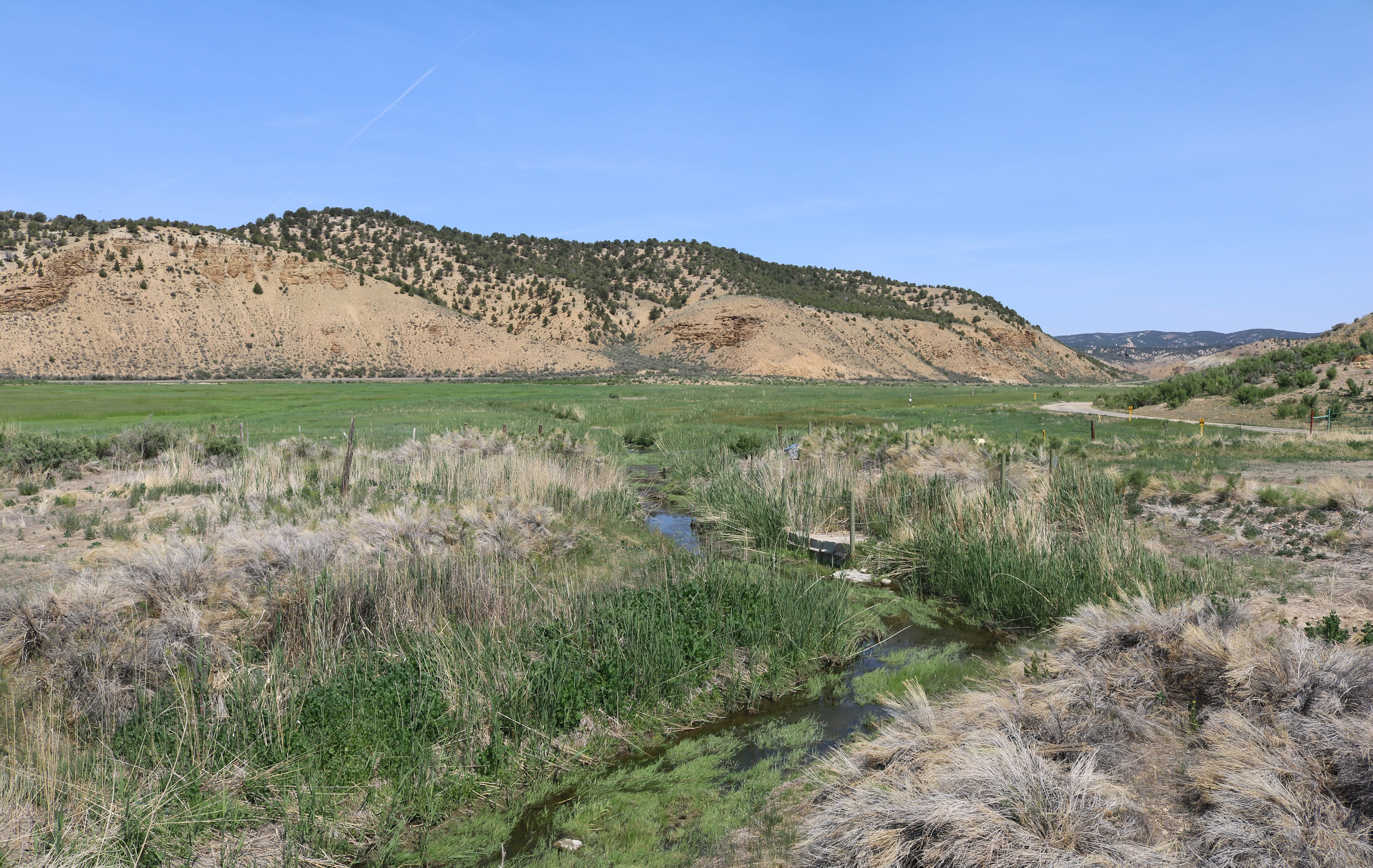
- Piceance Creek viewed from a bridge on County Road 22, June 2021

Physical characteristics
- Source
  - coordinates: 39°47′27″N 107°52′36″W
- Mouth
  - location: Confluence with White River
  - coordinates: 40°05′24″N 108°14′42″W
  - elevation: 5,702 ft (1,738 m)

Basin features
- Progression: White—Green—Colorado

Piceance Creek is a 57.9-mile-long (93.2 km) tributary of the White River in Garfield and Rio Blanco counties in Colorado, United States. The name likely derives from the Shoshoni word /piasonittsi/ meaning “tall grass” (/pia-/ ‘big’ and /soni-/ ‘grass’).

== See also ==
- List of rivers of Colorado
- List of tributaries of the Colorado River
