= Angora, Colorado =

Ghost town in Rio Blanco County, Colorado, United States

- Ghost town
- Location of Angora, Colorado. Angora (Colorado)
- Coordinates: 40°10′36″N 108°34′32″W
- Country: United States
- State: Colorado
- County: Rio Blanco

Government
  - Type: Ghost town
  - Body: Rio Blanco County
- Elevation: 5,466 ft (1,666 m)
- Time zone: UTC−07:00 (MST)
  - Summer (DST): UTC−06:00 (MDT)
- GNIS pop ID: 171599

Angora is an extinct town in Rio Blanco County, in the U.S. state of Colorado.

== History ==
The Angora, Colorado, post office operated from October 24, 1896, until September 30, 1912. An Angora school district was organized in 1904 and the school was named for a local resident who raised angora goats. In 1940, the schoolhouse burned down and was replaced with a new building. The Angora district operated until 1952, when the district voted to transfer students to Rangely.

== See also ==
- List of populated places in Colorado
