= White River (Green River tributary) =

River in Colorado and Utah, United States

White River Rio Blanco
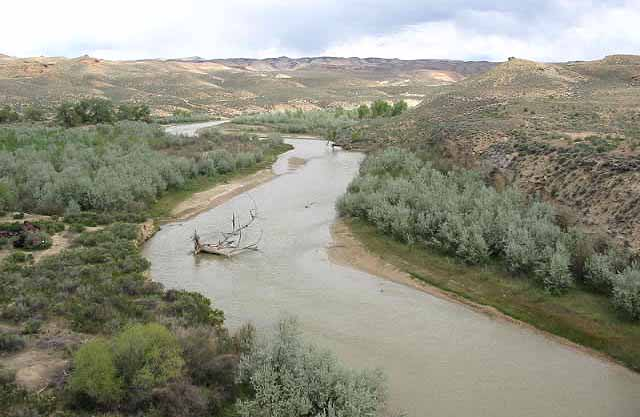
- The White River in Uintah County, Utah

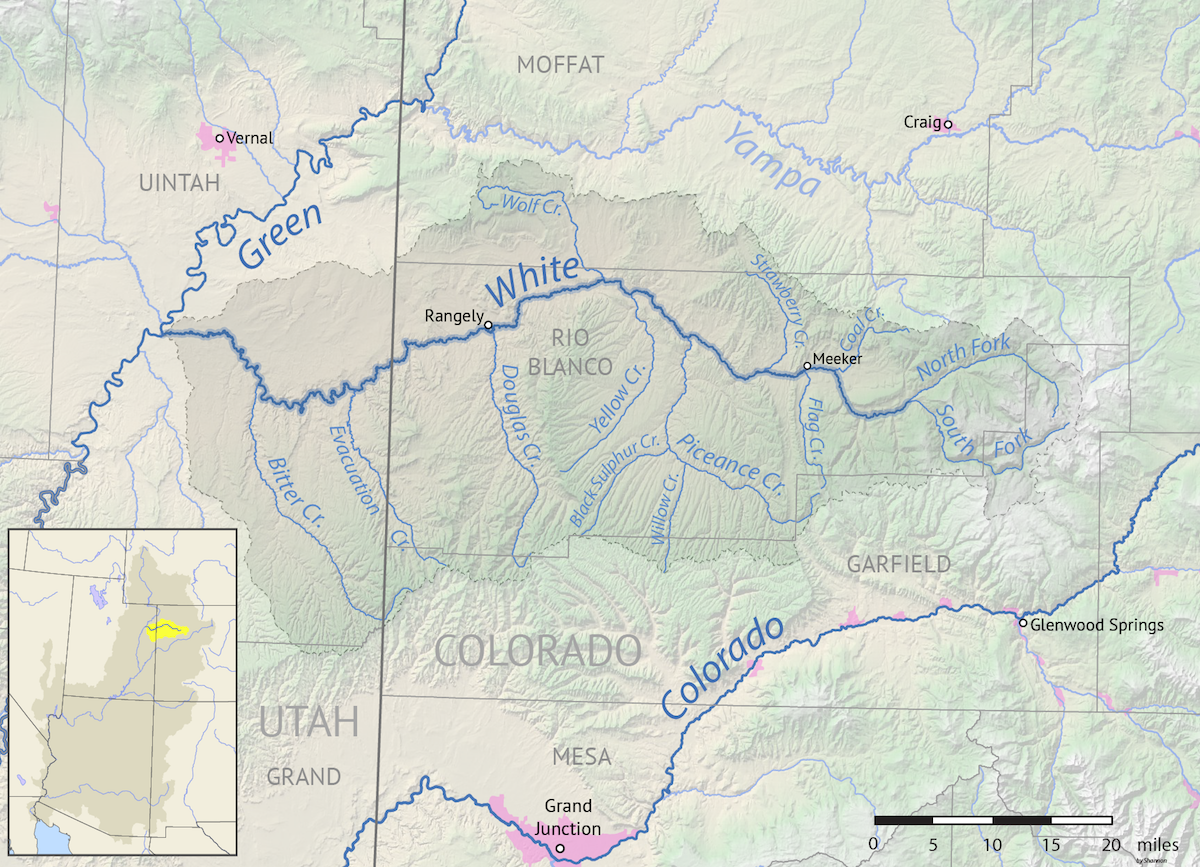
- Map of the White River watershed

Location
- Country: United States
- State: Colorado, Utah
- Cities: Meeker, Colorado, Rangely, Colorado, Bonanza, Utah, Ouray, Utah

Physical characteristics
- Source: Confluence of North Fork and South Fork
  - location: Rio Blanco County, Colorado
  - coordinates: 39°58′22″N 107°38′18″W
  - elevation: 6,932 ft (2,113 m)
- Mouth: Green River
  - location: Uintah County, Utah
  - coordinates: 40°03′44″N 109°40′45″W
  - elevation: 4,646 ft (1,416 m)
- Length: 195 mi (314 km)
- Basin size: 5,120 sq mi (13,300 km^{2})
- Discharge
  - location: Watson, Utah
  - average: 689 cu ft/s (19.5 m^{3}/s)
  - minimum: 13 cu ft/s (0.37 m^{3}/s)
  - maximum: 8,160 cu ft/s (231 m^{3}/s)

Basin features
- River system: Colorado River
- Tributaries
  - left: South Fork White River
  - right: North Fork White River

White River is a river, approximately 195 miles (314 km) long, in the U.S. states of Colorado and Utah and is a tributary of the Green River (which flows into the Colorado River).

== Description ==
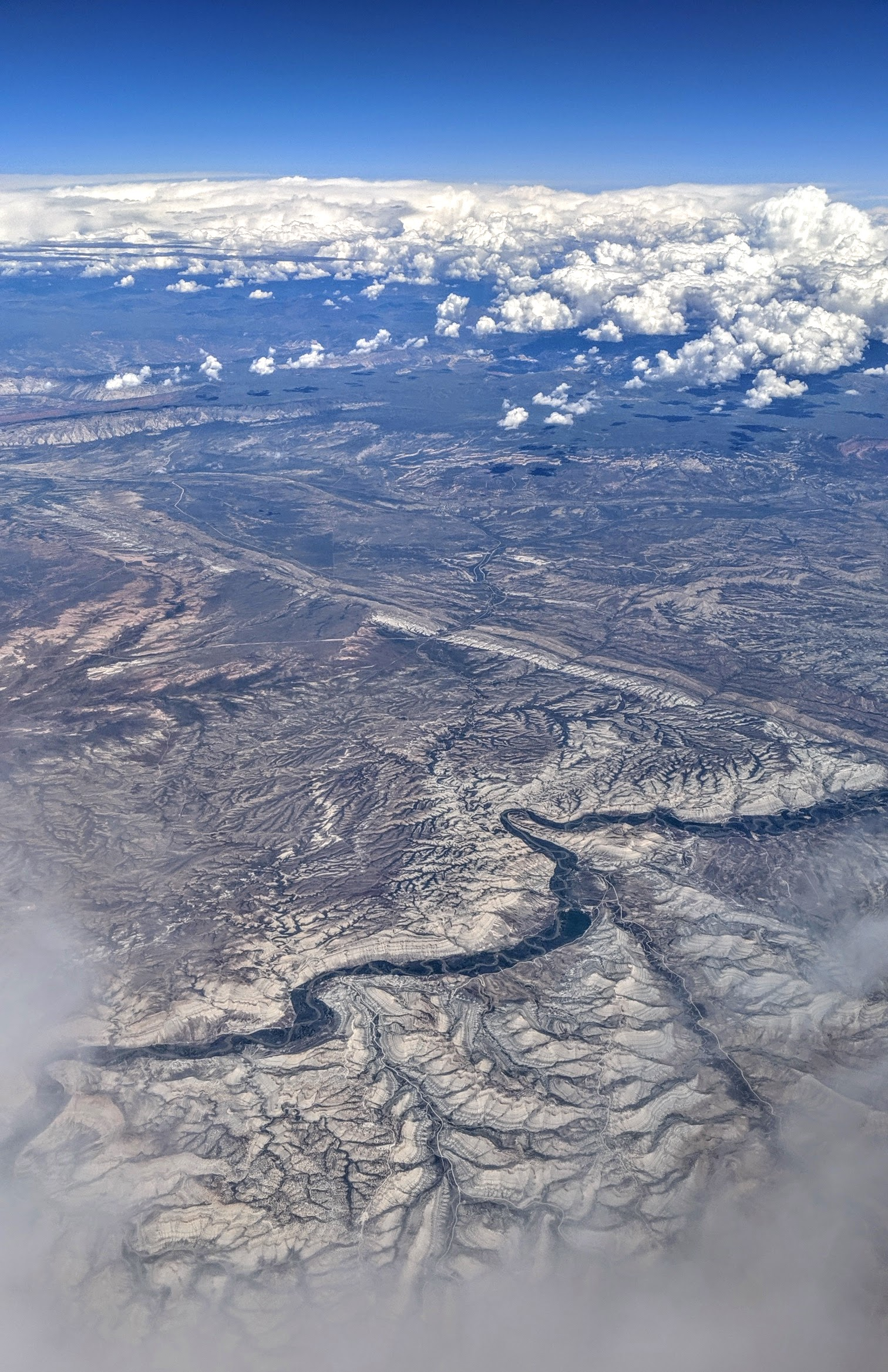
White River at Dripping Rock Creek, Colorado

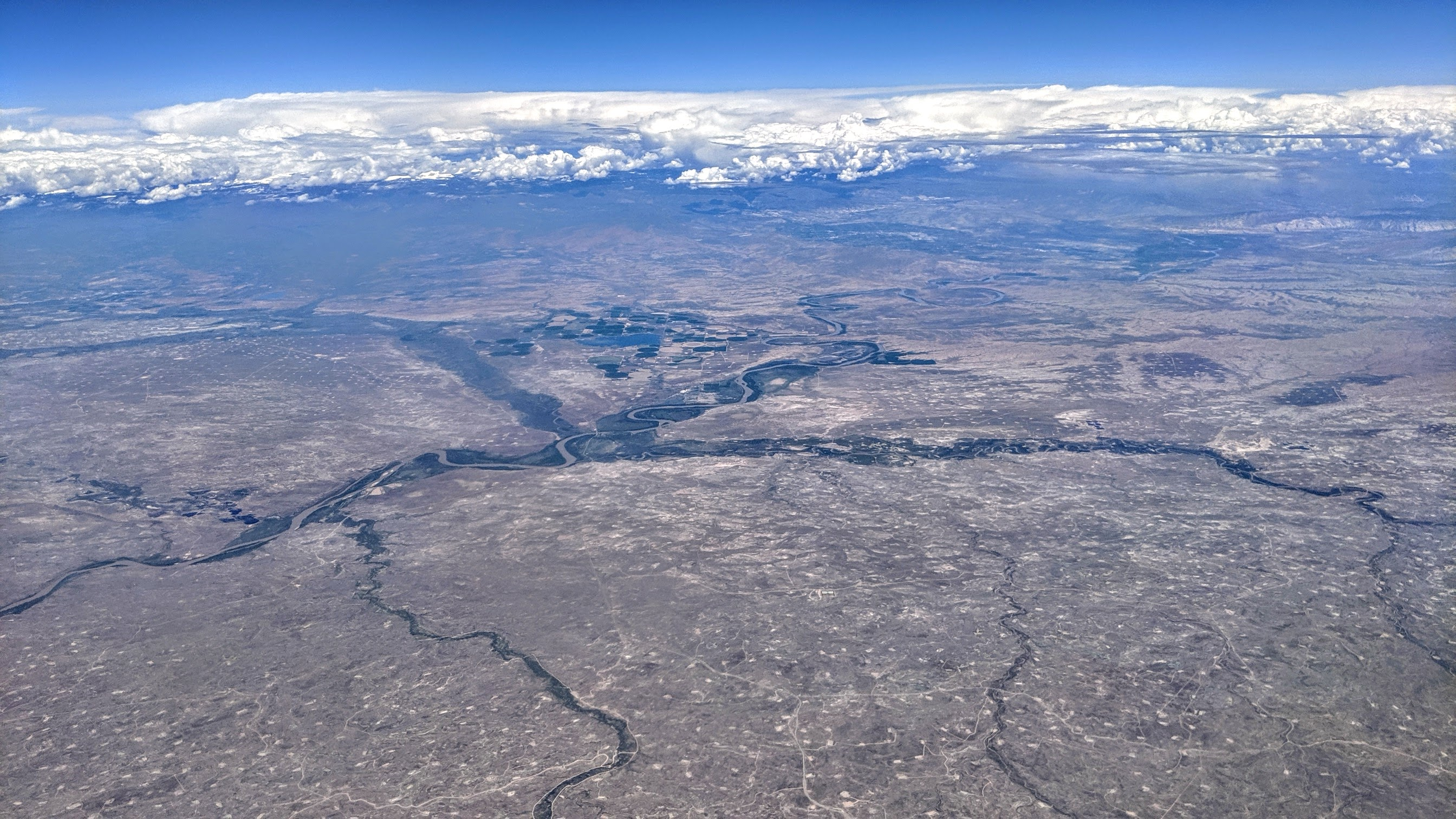
Ouray, Utah, where the White River (right) joins the Green River

The river rises in two forks in northwestern Colorado in northeastern Garfield County in the Flat Tops Wilderness Area in the White River National Forest. The North Fork rises in Wall Lake and flows northwest, then southwest. The South Fork rises ten miles south of the north, flows southwest, then northwest, past Spring Cave. The two forks join near Buford in eastern Rio Blanco County, forming the White. It flows west, then northwest, past Meeker (site of the White River Museum), and across the broad valley between the Danforth Hills on the north and the Roan Plateau on the south. Downstream from Meeker, it is joined by Piceance Creek and Yellow Creek. In western Rio Blanco County, it turns southwest, flows past Rangely, where it is joined by Douglas Creek, and into Uintah County, Utah, where it joins the Green 2 miles (3.2 km) south of Ouray.

The White River is navigable by small boats throughout most of its length. But in low water years, the water level may be too low for navigation for a period of several months. Flows vary from 400 cu ft/s (11 m^{3}/s) in late summers of dry years to well over 3,000 cu ft/s (85 m^{3}/s) in spring.

== Dams and reservoirs ==
The river is dammed in two places, both in Colorado. Taylor Draw Dam creates Kenney Reservoir near Rangely, and the Johnnie Johnson Dam impounds Rio Blanco Lake near White River City.

== Climate ==
According to the Köppen climate classification system, the White River basin has a semi-arid climate, abbreviated "BSk" on climate maps.

== See also ==
- List of rivers of Colorado
- List of rivers of Utah
- List of tributaries of the Colorado River
