= White River City, Colorado =

Unincorporated community in Rio Blanco County, Colorado, United States

White River City
- Unincorporated community
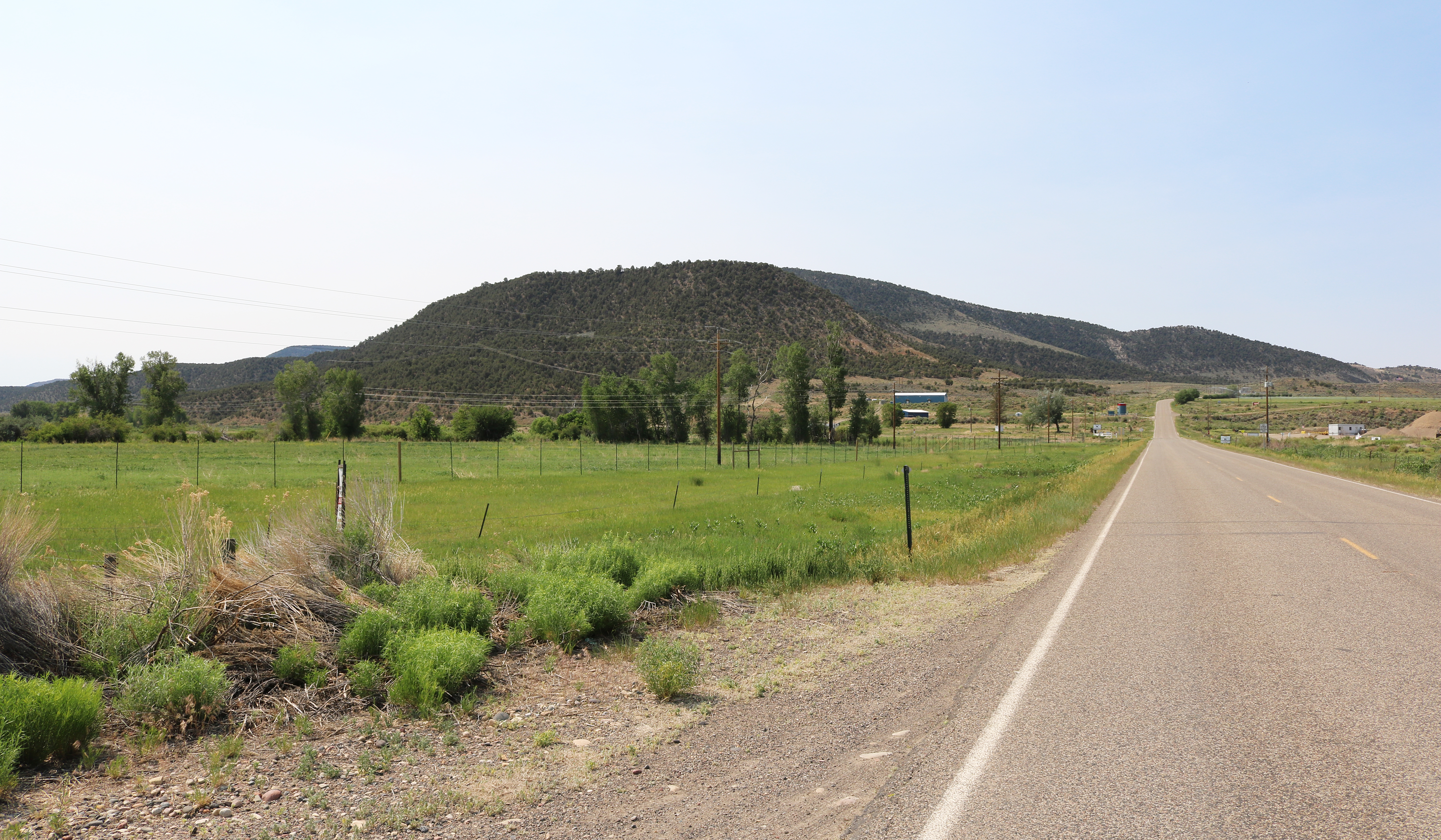

- Location of White River City White River City (the United States)
- Coordinates: 40°05′27″N 108°13′27″W
- Country: United States
- State: Colorado
- County: Rio Blanco
- Time zone: UTC-7 (MST)
  - Summer (DST): UTC-6 (MST)
- ZIP code: 81641
- Area code: 970
- GNIS town ID: 171722

White River City is an unincorporated community along the White River and Piceance Creek in Rio Blanco County, Colorado, United States. It is accessible via Colorado State Highway 64 and is located next to the Rio Blanco Lake.

== History ==
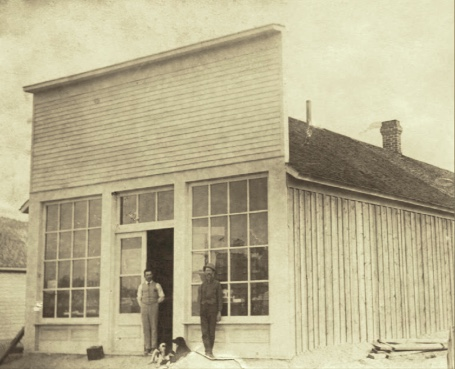
Ambrose Oldman, hailing from Gloucester, England, built his first store in the spring of 1888 in White River City on Piceance Creek

The post office, officially named White River, was operated from August 15, 1888, until March 15, 1908. The settlement was formerly incorporated in 1888 by brothers Reuben and Ambrose Oldman, in hope that a railroad would come through the area along the White River. Ambrose was involved in oil speculation in the area and ran a store on Piceance Creek until 1895, when he moved to Meeker. There was a schoolhouse in 1902.

== See also ==
- Colorow Mountain State Wildlife Area
