= Rangely, Colorado =

Town in Rio Blanco County, Colorado, United States

- Town
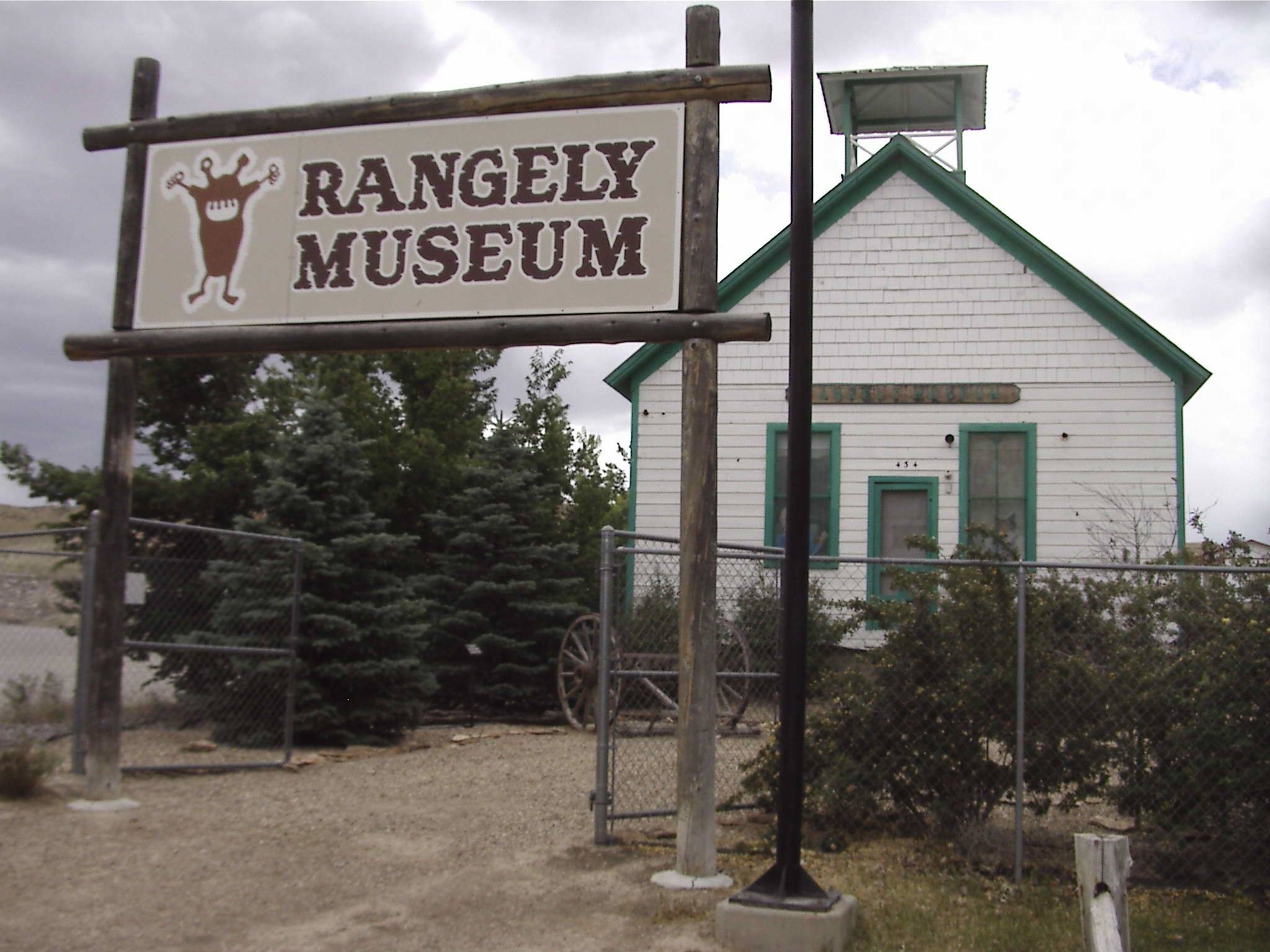
- Rangely Museum
- Nickname: Way outside of ordinary!
- Location of Rangely in Rio Blanco County, Colorado.
- Coordinates: 40°05′29″N 108°45′13″W
- Country: United States
- State: Colorado
- County: Rio Blanco
- Incorporated (town): August 27, 1946

Government
  - Type: Statutory Town
  - Mayor: Andy Shaffer
  - Town Manager: Lisa Piering

Area
  - Total: 4.31 sq mi (11.15 km^{2})
  - Land: 4.31 sq mi (11.15 km^{2})
  - Water: 0 sq mi (0.00 km^{2})
- Elevation: 5,276 ft (1,608 m)

Population (2020)
  - Total: 2,299
  - Density: 534.0/sq mi (206.2/km^{2})
- Time zone: UTC−7 (Mountain (MST))
  - Summer (DST): UTC−6 (MDT)
- ZIP code: 81648
- Area code: 970
- FIPS code: 08-62880
- GNIS feature ID: 2412528
- Website: townofrangely.colorado.gov

Rangely is a statutory town in Rio Blanco County, Colorado, United States. The population was 2,299 at the 2020 census. Rangely is the home of Colorado Northwestern Community College.

== Description ==
The town is home to one of two campuses of the Colorado Northwestern Community College.

A post office called Rangely was established in 1884. The community was named after Rangeley, Maine, the native home of a local businessperson.

== Geography ==
According to the United States Census Bureau, the town has a total area of 4.0 square miles (10 km^{2}), all of it land.

The terrain is mountain desert and is dry for most of the year.

=== Climate ===
According to the Köppen Climate Classification system, Rangely has a cold semi-arid climate, abbreviated "BSk" on climate maps. The hottest temperature recorded in Rangely was 108 °F (42.2 °C) on June 21, 1974, while the coldest temperature recorded was −37 °F (−38.3 °C) on February 15, 1895, and January 2, 1952.

Climate data for Rangely, Colorado, 1991–2020 normals, extremes 1894–present
Month	Jan	Feb	Mar	Apr	May	Jun	Jul	Aug	Sep	Oct	Nov	Dec	Year
Record high °F (°C)	64 (18)	67 (19)	78 (26)	86 (30)	95 (35)	108 (42)	104 (40)	106 (41)	98 (37)	87 (31)	74 (23)	62 (17)	108 (42)
Mean maximum °F (°C)	44.8 (7.1)	53.8 (12.1)	68.6 (20.3)	78.0 (25.6)	86.5 (30.3)	96.0 (35.6)	99.6 (37.6)	97.2 (36.2)	91.3 (32.9)	80.3 (26.8)	62.9 (17.2)	48.5 (9.2)	100.2 (37.9)
Mean daily maximum °F (°C)	31.1 (−0.5)	39.5 (4.2)	53.6 (12.0)	62.4 (16.9)	72.9 (22.7)	85.2 (29.6)	92.5 (33.6)	89.7 (32.1)	80.2 (26.8)	65.5 (18.6)	48.4 (9.1)	33.1 (0.6)	62.8 (17.1)
Daily mean °F (°C)	16.9 (−8.4)	24.9 (−3.9)	38.3 (3.5)	46.4 (8.0)	56.3 (13.5)	66.9 (19.4)	74.0 (23.3)	71.5 (21.9)	62.0 (16.7)	48.3 (9.1)	33.6 (0.9)	19.7 (−6.8)	46.6 (8.1)
Mean daily minimum °F (°C)	2.6 (−16.3)	10.2 (−12.1)	22.9 (−5.1)	30.3 (−0.9)	39.7 (4.3)	48.6 (9.2)	55.4 (13.0)	53.3 (11.8)	43.8 (6.6)	31.1 (−0.5)	18.7 (−7.4)	6.2 (−14.3)	30.2 (−1.0)
Mean minimum °F (°C)	−11.8 (−24.3)	−5.1 (−20.6)	11.6 (−11.3)	20.3 (−6.5)	30.1 (−1.1)	39.4 (4.1)	49.4 (9.7)	47.7 (8.7)	33.9 (1.1)	20.2 (−6.6)	6.0 (−14.4)	−8.9 (−22.7)	−15.0 (−26.1)
Record low °F (°C)	−37 (−38)	−37 (−38)	−17 (−27)	−6 (−21)	8 (−13)	25 (−4)	33 (1)	24 (−4)	20 (−7)	−4 (−20)	−15 (−26)	−64 (−53)	−64 (−53)
Average precipitation inches (mm)	0.67 (17)	0.68 (17)	0.87 (22)	1.06 (27)	1.22 (31)	0.73 (19)	0.68 (17)	0.96 (24)	1.29 (33)	1.23 (31)	0.88 (22)	0.62 (16)	10.89 (276)
Average snowfall inches (cm)	8.0 (20)	5.6 (14)	3.1 (7.9)	1.4 (3.6)	0.1 (0.25)	0.0 (0.0)	0.0 (0.0)	0.0 (0.0)	0.0 (0.0)	0.6 (1.5)	3.3 (8.4)	7.4 (19)	29.5 (74.65)
Average extreme snow depth inches (cm)	7.3 (19)	6.7 (17)	3.5 (8.9)	0.8 (2.0)	0.0 (0.0)	0.0 (0.0)	0.0 (0.0)	0.0 (0.0)	0.0 (0.0)	0.6 (1.5)	2.6 (6.6)	6.4 (16)	9.1 (23)
Average precipitation days (≥ 0.01 in)	5.7	4.8	5.3	6.6	6.8	3.9	4.8	6.2	5.9	5.7	4.5	5.1	65.3
Average snowy days (≥ 0.1 in)	4.4	3.4	1.7	0.9	0.1	0.0	0.0	0.0	0.0	0.4	2.2	4.4	17.5
Source 1: NOAA
Source 2: National Weather Service

== History ==
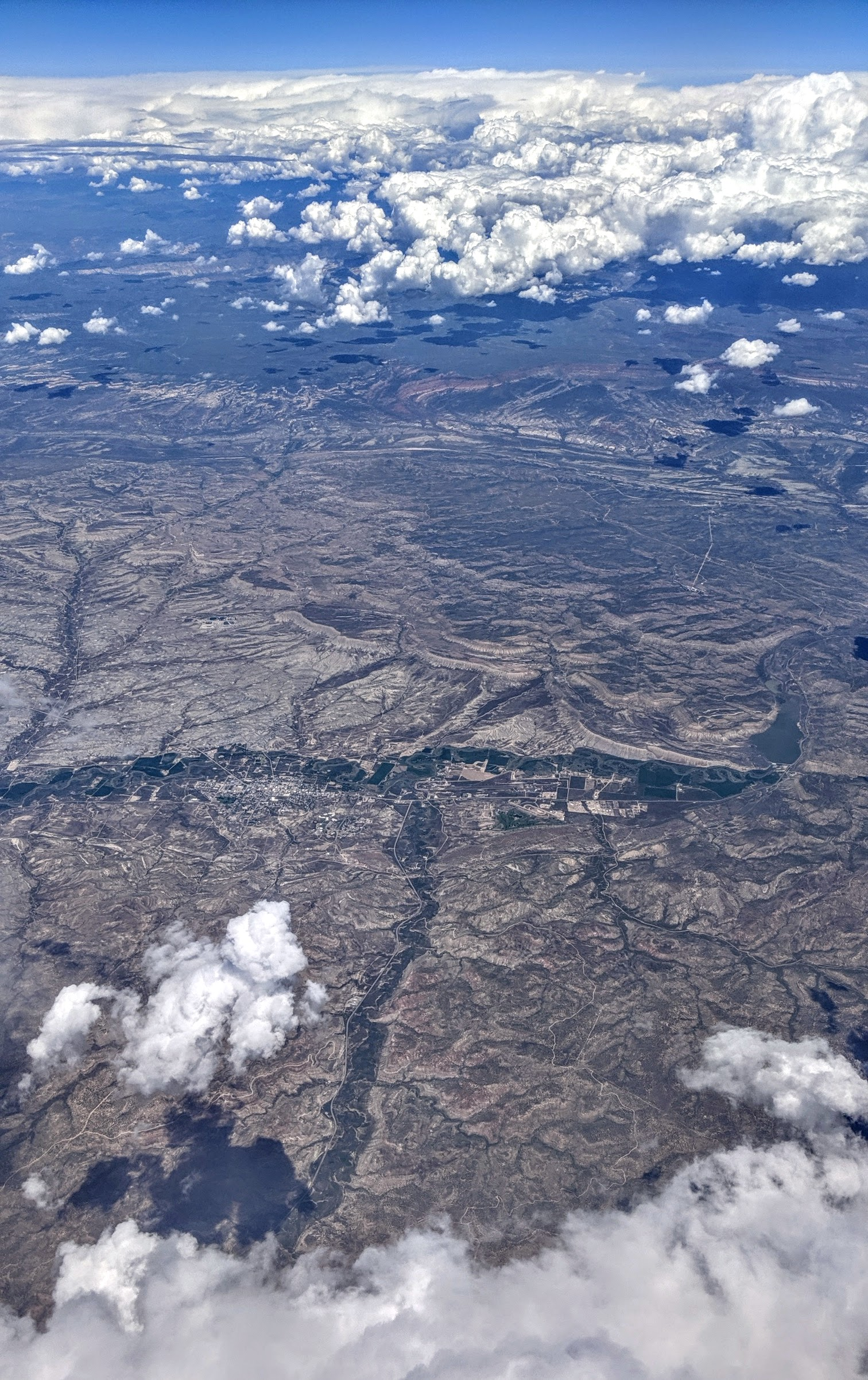
Aerial view of Rangely and the White River, May 2019

The land is what makes the town of Rangely interesting. The land is the base from which all human events unfold, whether it is the geology that brought the miners and oil men, or the water that brought the Fremonts, the Utes, the explorers, the ranchers.

To tell the story we must start back in the earlier history of the earth when a shallow sea encompassed most of the area around, 300 million years ago in what is labeled as the Pennsylvanian Period. and Permian geologic periods. During this time marine creatures would become fossils and can actually still be discovered around Rangely. Huge dunes were formed on the edges of this sea and became porous rock that is now known as the Weber Formation. This formed what is called an "anticline." An anticline is a ridge-shaped fold of stratified rock in which the strata slope downward from the crest. Then, as the sea receded, dinosaurs left bones and the extensive plant growth became oil and coal.

The innumerable canyons, draws, and gullies of the area held creeks, rivers and streams which attracted the early Fremont and Ute peoples. The Fremont people migrated to the Rangely area from the Great Basin in south-central Utah between 400 B.C. and 650 A.D. What we know about the Fremont comes from the artifacts they left in the area and from their homes and campsites which we find in the nearby canyons. Evidence of the Fremont people is plentiful in and around Rangely; for example, the rock art on Colorado 139 and Dragon Trail are both examples of Fremont Art. A Fremont dwelling in Texas Creek Overlook was an atypical dwelling for the Fremont people.

In many places around Rangely the art echoes images from other sites in the southwest. The art of the historical Utes records their history of conflict with the white settlers who began moving into the area in the 1800s. Their art is also the first to include horses originally brought by the Spanish.

The first recorded white settlers making a permanent home in the area were Mr. Joseph Studer and C.P. Hill who came in 1882, the same year the Ute people were to be confined to reservations in southern Colorado and eastern Utah. Some time later Mr. Hill was joined by his relatives, among them a cousin, Lee S. Chase, who named the town after Rangeley, Maine. Mr. Hill began ranching and opened a trading post. All supplies were freighted—first from Salt Lake City, Utah, by team and wagon, then from Grand Junction, Colorado, via Douglas Pass. By 1913 there were enough ranching and farming families in the area to necessitate the building of a large one-room school house (now located in the Rangely Outdoor Museum.)

Interestingly, the Utes had long been aware of oil in the area. The first shallow wells drilled in 1903 produced about 10 barrels of oil per day. Chevron arrived in 1931. In 1932, after a year of drilling Raven A-1, the first deep oil well, successfully reached the vast pocket of crude in the Weber formation at a depth of more than 6,000 feet, but there was no market for the 230 barrels it produced each day; however, the well was known as the most productive oil well of all time. The well was capped until everything changed for this sleepy little town with the large demand for oil required during the Second World War. Chevron reopened the Raven A-1 well and Rangely became a booming oil camp.

By 1946 raising cattle and sheep, farming, shallow oil well drilling, and mining coal were no longer the principle industries. Deep well drilling was king. Tents, trolley cars, crude cabins and trailers took over the dozen homes. The one store, post office, filling station, library, pool hall, Red Cross first aid station, and hotel suddenly had competition from a slew of businesses, including motels, cafes, bars, cleaners, movie theater, bowling alley, and more. The school had been accredited up to three years of high school with senior year taken elsewhere, usually Meeker, or forfeited. Company camps were built in many places in the valley, and in 1947 Rangely was incorporated as a town with Fred Nichols voted in as Mayor. In the 1960s the Rangely oil field was a major producer in the country and deemed such an important strategic asset that bomb shelters were built at the college and supplied with coats, blankets, food and water.

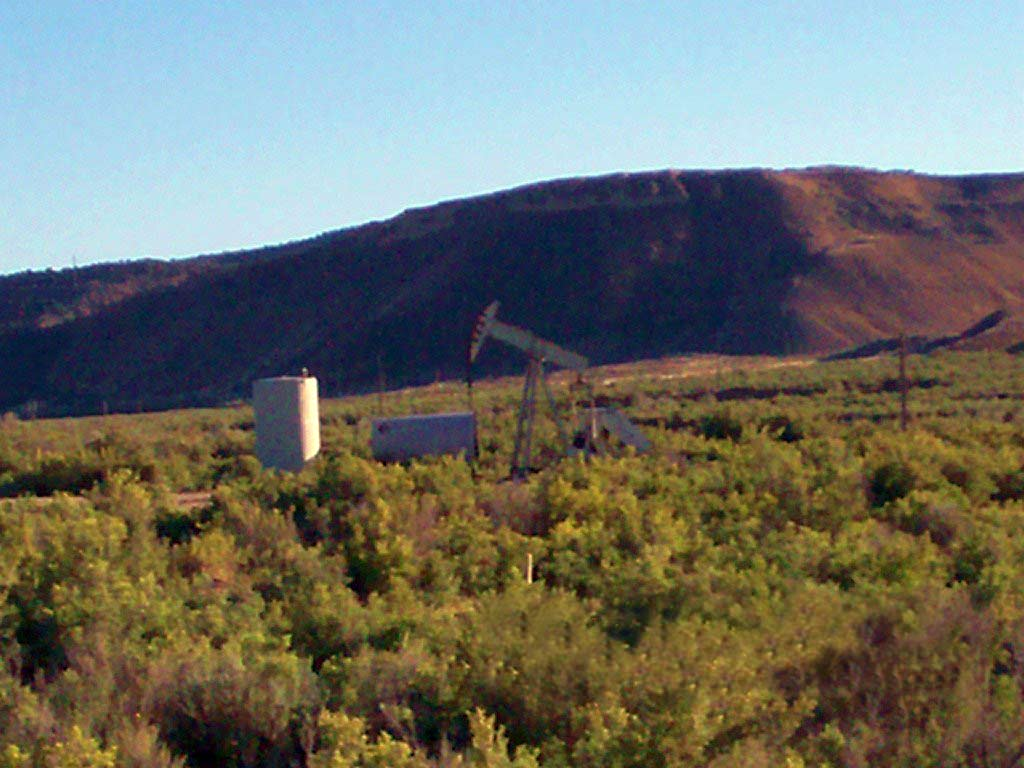
Oil well near Rangely, 2007

By 1949 there were 478 wells across 30 miles in the Weber formation. The peak rate of the area was 82,000 by 1956. Rangely's oil field was known as the Rangely Weber Sand Unit by 1998 and recovered more than 815 million barrels of oil, making it the largest field in the Rocky Mountain Region. This Region has 406 producing wells, 351 injection wells and produces about one third of Colorado's oil production coming out to a huge 20,000 barrels a day. The Weber Basin, has recovered an additional 12 million barrels of oil from the shallower Mancos Shale at depths less than 2000 feet. The Sand Unit is a unitized field so is owned by many, but only Chevron USA Production operates the field. Major oil companies, smaller independent oil companies, trust and individuals numbering almost 30 share the expenses and the benefits of the field today. The Unit provides jobs for approximately 300 individuals and makes up about 70 percent of the property tax revenue for Rio Blanco County.

In 2015, Colorado Northwestern Community College, Rangely Campus, began the excavation of an important fossil dig of the bones and very rare skin and tendons of a Duckbill Dinosaur which was located in Rangely. The Duckbill Dinosaur, which ultimately took on the name of Walter, was excavated and the fossils were airlifted to a federal repository on Colorado Northwestern Coummunity College's Craig Campus on Thursday, July 11, 2019.

== Historic places ==
Near Rangely are the following prehistoric Fremont culture sites listed as National Register of Historic Places:

Prehistoric sites
- Collage Shelter Site – dated from 500–1499 AD.
- Cañon Pintado – dated from 500–1899 AD.
- Carrot Men Pictograph Site – dated from 500–1499 AD.
- Fremont Lookout Fortification Site – dated from 0–1499 AD

== Demographics ==
Historical population
Census	Pop.	Note	%±
1950	808		—
1960	1,464		81.2%
1970	1,591		8.7%
1980	2,113		32.8%
1990	2,278		7.8%
2000	2,096		−8.0%
2010	2,365		12.8%
2020	2,299		−2.8%

=== 2020 census ===
As of the 2020 census, Rangely had a population of 2,299. The median age was 33.8 years. 25.4% of residents were under the age of 18 and 12.6% of residents were 65 years of age or older. For every 100 females there were 100.4 males, and for every 100 females age 18 and over there were 100.9 males age 18 and over.

0.0% of residents lived in urban areas, while 100.0% lived in rural areas.

There were 854 households and 825 families in Rangely, of which 34.3% had children under the age of 18 living in them. Of all households, 49.8% were married-couple households, 21.8% were households with a male householder and no spouse or partner present, and 22.0% were households with a female householder and no spouse or partner present. About 29.7% of all households were made up of individuals and 11.3% had someone living alone who was 65 years of age or older.

There were 1,118 housing units, of which 23.6% were vacant. The homeowner vacancy rate was 3.9% and the rental vacancy rate was 33.9%.

Racial composition as of the 2020 census
Race	Number	Percent
White	1,979	86.1%
Black or African American	15	0.7%
American Indian and Alaska Native	23	1.0%
Asian	14	0.6%
Native Hawaiian and Other Pacific Islander	0	0.0%
Some other race	127	5.5%
Two or more races	141	6.1%
Hispanic or Latino (of any race)	264	11.5%

=== Demographic estimates ===
The ancestry of Rangely was 16.5% English, 16.2% German, 12.2% Irish, 3.5% Polish, 2.7% Scottish, 2.7% French, 2.1% Norwegian, and 1.8% Italian.

12.9% of the population were veterans.

=== Income and poverty ===
The median household income was $60,972, with families having $84,167, married couples having $95,185, and non-families having $43,162. 11.7% of the population were in poverty.

== Landmarks ==
For decades, Rangely has been the location of an unused water tank, prized for its remarkable internal resonance, in which sounds may sustain for up to 40 seconds. Now known as The Tank Center for Sonic Arts, the 65-foot tower has been repurposed as a concert and recording venue.

Kenney Reservoir is about five miles east of town along Colorado State Highway 64. It offers camping, fishing, and boating.

== See also ==
- List of municipalities in Colorado
