= Buford, Colorado =

Unincorporated community in Rio Blanco County, Colorado, United States

- Unincorporated community
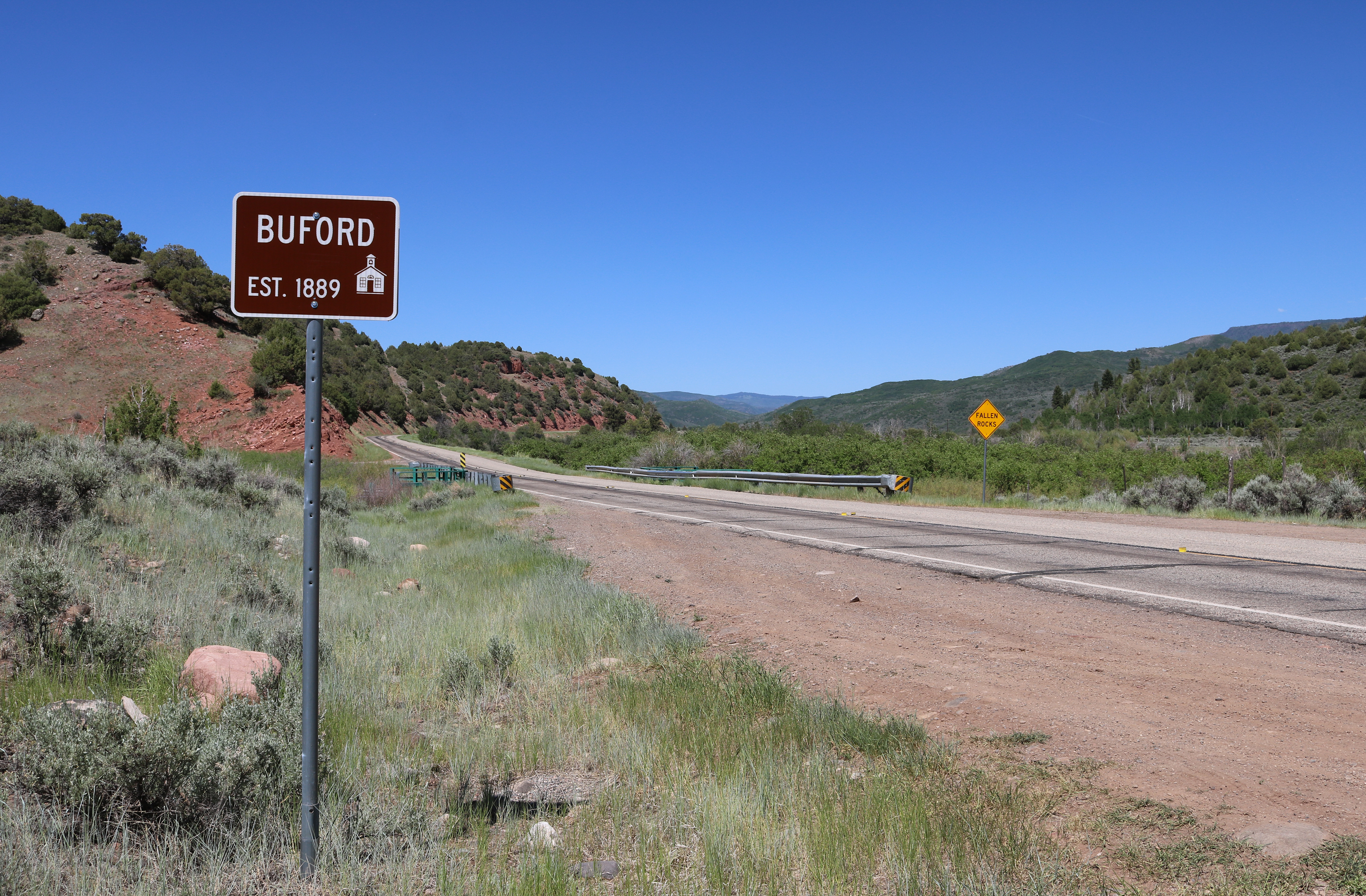
- Entering Buford from the west along County Road 8, June 2021.

- Location of Buford, Colorado. Buford (Colorado)
- Coordinates: 39°59′14″N 107°37′00″W
- Country: United States
- State: Colorado
- County: Rio Blanco County

Government
  - Type: Unincorporated community
  - Body: Rio Blanco County
- Elevation: 7,028 ft (2,142 m)
- Time zone: UTC−07:00 (MST)
  - Summer (DST): UTC−06:00 (MDT)
- GNIS pop ID: 173624

Buford is an unincorporated community in Rio Blanco County, Colorado, United States.

== History ==
The Buford, Colorado, post office operated from March 19, 1890, until December 15, 1961. The community was named after John Buford, an officer in the American Civil War.

== Climate ==
Marvine Ranch is a weather station near Buford, situated at an elevation of 7800 ft (2377 m).

Climate data for Marvine Ranch, Colorado, 1981–2010 normals, 1951–2001 extremes: 7800ft (2377m)
Month	Jan	Feb	Mar	Apr	May	Jun	Jul	Aug	Sep	Oct	Nov	Dec	Year
Record high °F (°C)	59 (15)	64 (18)	64 (18)	82 (28)	86 (30)	92 (33)	92 (33)	95 (35)	88 (31)	79 (26)	68 (20)	65 (18)	95 (35)
Mean maximum °F (°C)	47.8 (8.8)	49.9 (9.9)	55.1 (12.8)	64.6 (18.1)	74.0 (23.3)	82.3 (27.9)	84.2 (29.0)	83.4 (28.6)	79.2 (26.2)	70.5 (21.4)	56.3 (13.5)	48.5 (9.2)	86.0 (30.0)
Mean daily maximum °F (°C)	34.4 (1.3)	36.1 (2.3)	42.7 (5.9)	50.3 (10.2)	60.4 (15.8)	71.3 (21.8)	78.1 (25.6)	76.2 (24.6)	68.6 (20.3)	56.3 (13.5)	41.6 (5.3)	32.2 (0.1)	54.0 (12.2)
Daily mean °F (°C)	18.5 (−7.5)	19.7 (−6.8)	27.4 (−2.6)	34.7 (1.5)	43.5 (6.4)	52.6 (11.4)	58.7 (14.8)	57.4 (14.1)	50.3 (10.2)	39.5 (4.2)	26.5 (−3.1)	16.6 (−8.6)	37.1 (2.8)
Mean daily minimum °F (°C)	2.7 (−16.3)	3.4 (−15.9)	12.1 (−11.1)	19.0 (−7.2)	26.6 (−3.0)	33.9 (1.1)	39.3 (4.1)	38.6 (3.7)	32.1 (0.1)	22.6 (−5.2)	11.3 (−11.5)	1.1 (−17.2)	20.2 (−6.5)
Mean minimum °F (°C)	−21.5 (−29.7)	−18.2 (−27.9)	−9.3 (−22.9)	0.1 (−17.7)	15.2 (−9.3)	23.1 (−4.9)	30.2 (−1.0)	30.0 (−1.1)	20.1 (−6.6)	5.4 (−14.8)	−9.8 (−23.2)	−19.2 (−28.4)	−32.3 (−35.7)
Record low °F (°C)	−40 (−40)	−45 (−43)	−32 (−36)	−16 (−27)	6 (−14)	15 (−9)	23 (−5)	21 (−6)	11 (−12)	−10 (−23)	−30 (−34)	−44 (−42)	−45 (−43)
Average precipitation inches (mm)	2.37 (60)	2.08 (53)	2.18 (55)	2.37 (60)	2.30 (58)	1.81 (46)	1.94 (49)	1.78 (45)	2.53 (64)	2.29 (58)	2.41 (61)	2.53 (64)	26.59 (673)
Average snowfall inches (cm)	36.4 (92)	30.3 (77)	30.2 (77)	21.1 (54)	5.5 (14)	0.0 (0.0)	0.0 (0.0)	0.0 (0.0)	0.3 (0.76)	6.2 (16)	34.9 (89)	41.2 (105)	206.1 (524.76)
Average precipitation days (≥ 0.01 in)	8.7	7.7	8.8	6.9	7.1	5.3	7.6	6.7	7.0	5.4	7.2	8.7	87.1
Average snowy days (≥ 0.1 in)	8.8	7.6	8.4	5.6	1.4	0.0	0.0	0.0	0.1	1.2	5.6	9.0	47.7
Source 1: NOAA
Source 2: WRCC (extremes)

== See also ==
- List of populated places in Colorado
