= Rio Blanco County, Colorado =

County in Colorado, United States

- County
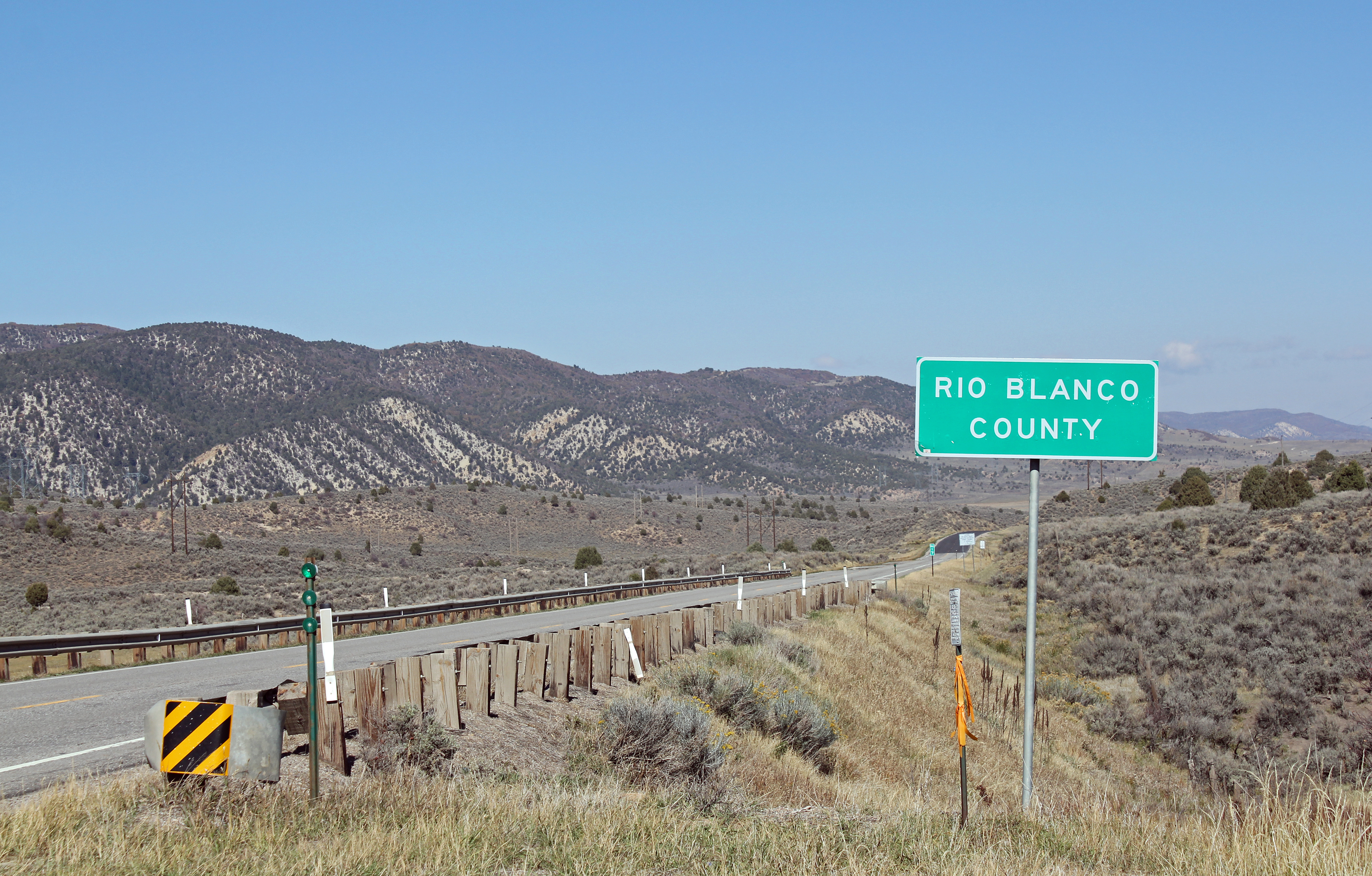
- Entering the county from the south on State Highway 13.

- Location within the U.S. state of Colorado
- Coordinates: 39.98°N 108.20°W
- Country: United States
- State: Colorado
- Founded: March 25, 1889
- Named for: White River
- Seat: Meeker
- Largest town: Meeker

Area
  - Total: 3,223 sq mi (8,350 km^{2})
  - Land: 3,221 sq mi (8,340 km^{2})
  - Water: 1.9 sq mi (4.9 km^{2}) 0.06%

Population (2020)
  - Total: 6,529
  - Estimate (2025): 6,683 ▲
  - Density: 2.027/sq mi (0.7826/km^{2})
- Time zone: UTC−7 (Mountain)
  - Summer (DST): UTC−6 (MDT)
- Congressional district: 3rd
- Website: www.rbc.us

Rio Blanco County (Spanish: Condado del Río Blanco) is a county located in the U.S. state of Colorado. As of the 2020 census, the population was 6,529. The county seat is Meeker. The name of the county is the Spanish name for the White River which runs through it.

== History ==
Rio Blanco County was created on March 25, 1889, when it was split from Garfield County. The town of Meeker became the county seat.

On May 17, 1973, Rio Blanco County became one of two counties in Colorado to have a peaceful nuclear explosion as a part of Operation Plowshare. There were three nearly simultaneous explosions targeted at producing unconventional natural gas, all detonated as Project Rio Blanco. The other county is Garfield County under Project Rulison.

In August 2025, the Lee Fire burned in Rio Blanco County. The fire burned over 137,000 acres, becoming the fourth-largest wildfire in Colorado history.

== Geography ==
According to the U.S. Census Bureau, the county has a total area of 3,223 square miles (8,350 km^{2}), of which 3,221 square miles (8,340 km^{2}) is land and 1.9 square miles (4.9 km^{2}) (0.06%) is water.

=== Adjacent counties ===
- Moffat County - north
- Routt County - northeast
- Garfield County - south
- Uintah County, Utah - west

=== Major highways ===
- State Highway 13
- State Highway 64
- State Highway 139

=== National protected areas ===
- Routt National Forest
- White River National Forest
- Flat Tops Wilderness

=== Scenic byways ===
- Dinosaur Diamond Prehistoric Highway National Scenic Byway
- Flat Tops Trail Scenic Byway

=== State parks and wildlife areas ===
- Colorow Mountain State Wildlife Area

== Demographics ==
Historical population
Census	Pop.	Note	%±
1890	1,200		—
1900	1,690		40.8%
1910	2,332		38.0%
1920	3,135		34.4%
1930	2,980		−4.9%
1940	2,943		−1.2%
1950	4,719		60.3%
1960	5,150		9.1%
1970	4,842		−6.0%
1980	6,255		29.2%
1990	5,972		−4.5%
2000	5,986		0.2%
2010	6,666		11.4%
2020	6,529		−2.1%
2025 (est.)	6,683	▲	2.4%
U.S. Decennial Census; 1790-1960 1900-1990; 1990-2000 2010-2020

=== 2020 census ===
As of the 2020 census, the county had a population of 6,529. Of the residents, 25.1% were under the age of 18 and 17.8% were 65 years of age or older; the median age was 38.1 years. For every 100 females there were 103.9 males, and for every 100 females age 18 and over there were 101.6 males. 0.0% of residents lived in urban areas and 100.0% lived in rural areas.

Rio Blanco County, Colorado – Racial and ethnic composition Note: the US Census treats Hispanic/Latino as an ethnic category. This table excludes Latinos from the racial categories and assigns them to a separate category. Hispanics/Latinos may be of any race.
Race / Ethnicity (NH = Non-Hispanic)	Pop 2000	Pop 2010	Pop 2020	% 2000	% 2010	% 2020
White alone (NH)	5,546	5,756	5,509	92.65%	86.35%	84.38%
Black or African American alone (NH)	11	49	29	0.18%	0.74%	0.44%
Native American or Alaska Native alone (NH)	37	44	51	0.62%	0.66%	0.78%
Asian alone (NH)	15	22	22	0.25%	0.33%	0.34%
Pacific Islander alone (NH)	0	11	2	0.00%	0.17%	0.03%
Other race alone (NH)	6	5	29	0.10%	0.08%	0.44%
Mixed race or Multiracial (NH)	75	114	265	1.25%	1.71%	4.06%
Hispanic or Latino (any race)	296	665	622	4.94%	9.98%	9.53%
Total	5,986	6,666	6,529	100.00%	100.00%	100.00%

The racial makeup of the county was 87.3% White, 0.5% Black or African American, 0.9% American Indian and Alaska Native, 0.3% Asian, 0.0% Native Hawaiian and Pacific Islander, 4.0% from some other race, and 6.9% from two or more races. Hispanic or Latino residents of any race comprised 9.5% of the population.

There were 2,592 households in the county, of which 32.3% had children under the age of 18 living with them and 21.5% had a female householder with no spouse or partner present. About 29.8% of all households were made up of individuals and 13.4% had someone living alone who was 65 years of age or older.

There were 3,274 housing units, of which 20.8% were vacant. Among occupied housing units, 69.3% were owner-occupied and 30.7% were renter-occupied. The homeowner vacancy rate was 3.1% and the rental vacancy rate was 20.4%.

=== 2000 census ===
At the 2000 census there were 5,986 people, 2,306 households, and 1,646 families living in the county. The population density was 2 people per square mile (0.77 people/km^{2}). There were 2,855 housing units at an average density of 1 units per square mile (0.39 units/km^{2}). The racial makeup of the county was 95.01% White, 0.18% Black or African American, 0.77% Native American, 0.28% Asian, 2.02% from other races, and 1.74% from two or more races. 4.94% of the population were Hispanic or Latino of any race. Of the 2,306 households 35.60% had children under the age of 18 living with them, 60.10% were married couples living together, 7.80% had a female householder with no husband present, and 28.60% were non-families. 24.80% of households were one person and 8.70% were one person aged 65 or older. The average household size was 2.50 and the average family size was 2.98.

The age distribution was 26.50% under the age of 18, 9.20% from 18 to 24, 27.50% from 25 to 44, 25.60% from 45 to 64, and 11.20% 65 or older. The median age was 38 years. For every 100 females there were 101.90 males. For every 100 females age 18 and over, there were 101.60 males.

The median household income was $37,711 and the median family income was $44,425. Males had a median income of $38,125 versus $19,940 for females. The per capita income for the county was $17,344. About 6.70% of families and 9.60% of the population were below the poverty line, including 11.60% of those under age 18 and 10.40% of those age 65 or over.

== Education ==
Rio Blanco County is home to Meeker School District RE-1 and Rangely School District RE-4, as well as Rangely Christian Academy, a private K-8 school.

The county is home to Colorado Northwestern Community College in Rangely, as well as an extension of Colorado State University in Meeker.

== Politics ==
Rio Blanco is an overwhelmingly Republican county in Presidential elections. It was along with Clark County, Idaho and Kane County, Utah one of only three counties west of the Continental Divide to vote for Alf Landon over Franklin Delano Roosevelt in 1936. In that election Rio Blanco was Landon's strongest county in the eleven western states, marginally shading normal Republican “banner county” Kane. Since that time only two Democrats – Harry S. Truman in 1948 and Lyndon Johnson who narrowly carried the county in 1964 – have obtained over forty percent of the county's vote. In fact, since 1968 only one Democratic presidential candidate, Michael Dukakis in 1988, and him only very marginally, has topped thirty percent of Rio Blanco County's ballots. In 2024, the county saw a swing to the Democratic nominee Kamala Harris (against both the state and national trends) but Donald Trump was still able to attain over 80% of the vote.

United States presidential election results for Rio Blanco County, Colorado
Year	Republican		Democratic		Third party(ies)	
Year	No.	%	No.	%	No.	%
1892	127	36.29%	0	0.00%	223	63.71%
1896	52	10.26%	454	89.55%	1	0.20%
1900	276	40.89%	391	57.93%	8	1.19%
1904	552	58.11%	391	41.16%	7	0.74%
1908	384	43.99%	466	53.38%	23	2.63%
1912	372	33.24%	538	48.08%	209	18.68%
1916	468	39.46%	702	59.19%	16	1.35%
1920	793	62.24%	455	35.71%	26	2.04%
1924	766	60.84%	407	32.33%	86	6.83%
1928	860	65.50%	429	32.67%	24	1.83%
1932	687	44.47%	826	53.46%	32	2.07%
1936	830	55.78%	587	39.45%	71	4.77%
1940	1,021	65.49%	530	34.00%	8	0.51%
1944	881	65.89%	451	33.73%	5	0.37%
1948	981	56.03%	752	42.95%	18	1.03%
1952	1,612	71.42%	633	28.05%	12	0.53%
1956	1,593	71.47%	635	28.49%	1	0.04%
1960	1,391	63.57%	794	36.29%	3	0.14%
1964	1,015	47.17%	1,134	52.70%	3	0.14%
1968	1,294	64.60%	502	25.06%	207	10.33%
1972	1,586	77.25%	414	20.17%	53	2.58%
1976	1,439	67.24%	627	29.30%	74	3.46%
1980	1,971	74.46%	462	17.45%	214	8.08%
1984	2,131	80.81%	484	18.35%	22	0.83%
1988	1,821	68.41%	803	30.17%	38	1.43%
1992	1,231	43.19%	778	27.30%	841	29.51%
1996	1,697	62.50%	731	26.92%	287	10.57%
2000	2,185	76.53%	543	19.02%	127	4.45%
2004	2,403	80.02%	566	18.85%	34	1.13%
2008	2,437	77.44%	655	20.81%	55	1.75%
2012	2,724	80.85%	568	16.86%	77	2.29%
2016	2,791	80.90%	436	12.64%	223	6.46%
2020	3,061	82.93%	561	15.20%	69	1.87%
2024	2,988	80.93%	637	17.25%	67	1.81%

United States Senate election results for Rio Blanco County, Colorado2
Year	Republican		Democratic		Third party(ies)	
Year	No.	%	No.	%	No.	%
2020	3,065	83.86%	529	14.47%	61	1.67%

United States Senate election results for Rio Blanco County, Colorado3
Year	Republican		Democratic		Third party(ies)	
Year	No.	%	No.	%	No.	%
2022	2,391	79.15%	525	17.38%	105	3.48%

Colorado Gubernatorial election results for Rio Blanco County
Year	Republican		Democratic		Third party(ies)	
Year	No.	%	No.	%	No.	%
2022	2,408	78.87%	507	16.61%	138	4.52%

In other statewide elections, Rio Blanco County also leans Republican, although it was carried by Democrat Roy Romer in 1990 – when he carried all but four counties statewide – and by Constitution Party candidate Tom Tancredo in 2010. Rio Blanco County was also carried by Democratic Senatorial candidate “Nighthorse” Campbell in 1992, although since then no Democratic candidate for this office has surpassed thirty percent since.

== Communities ==
=== Towns ===
- Meeker (county seat)
- Rangely

=== Unincorporated communities ===
- Angora
- Buford
- White River City

== See also ==
- Bibliography of Colorado
- Geography of Colorado
- History of Colorado
  - National Register of Historic Places listings in Rio Blanco County, Colorado
- Index of Colorado-related articles
- List of Colorado-related lists
  - List of counties in Colorado
- Outline of Colorado
