= Mike Treshow =

Danish mechanical engineer (1894–1986)

Michael Treshow V
- Born: 4 December 1894; Copenhagen
- Died: 26 January 1986 (aged 91)
- Occupation: Design Specialist

Michael Treshow V was a senior engineer at Argonne National Laboratory in Illinois before he was hired as a senior design specialist at General Atomic, where he was involved in drafting schematics for Project Orion.

Michael Treshow V, was a Danish mechanical engineer who had learnt shipbuilding in Copenhagen, who went on to work on Project Orion. Orion's specialist in bomb delivery was Michael Treshow, a Danish mechanical engineer who had been trained in shipbuilding in Copenhagen before visiting the United States in 1920 and becoming a permanent resident in 1929.

He was born 4 December 1894, in Copenhagen. He came over from Denmark to Southern California. He married a woman called Elsa. He moved from Malibu to Del Mar.

== Hoover Dam ==
Treshow was hired as a designer of construction tools to work on the Hoover Dam. During the construction of the Boulder (now Hoover) Dam between 1930 and 1936 he designed and supervised the installation of the equipment that pumped concrete - more than 8 million tons of it - from where it was mixed to the dam site. "Something over a mile as I recall," says his son, Ken. Treshow switched to nuclear reactor design and engineering after World War II.

== Argonne National Laboratory ==
He received Q clearance in 1950, while working as a senior engineer at Argonne National Laboratory in Illinois, and held some twenty patents in several fields. Treshow was Project Engineer on the Reactor Engineering Division for the Argonne Low Power Reactor (ALPR) (April 1956). General specifications were taken from Treshow's earlier study of a smaller, but similar power plant (May 1955).

"I am recognized as having an unusual talent for invention and development of new ideas and products," he wrote to Ed Creutz in November 1956, seeking a position at General Atomic, "3 1/2 years from now at age 65 I will compelled to retire from Argonne due to forced retirement rules. I feel this would be too early for me."

== Project Orion ==
Treshow was hired by General Atomic in February 1958, at age sixty-four, taking a position as a senior design specialist, with Ed Creutz making special arrangements to bend the company's retirement policies so that he could keep working as long as he wished. He soon joined the Orion team, drawing upon his training as a marine engineer and naval architect to produce detailed plans for the various components and permutations of the Orion ship. "He drew beautiful pictures with loving care and was very meticulous," says Freeman. "He was an old-fashioned draftsman, and loved to make everything exact."

Michael Treshow co-wrote a paper "Feasibility Study of a Nuclear Bomb-Propelled Space Vehicle, Interim Annual Report", 1 July 1958 – 1 June 1959, written by Brian Dunne, Freeman Dyson and Michael Treshow, edited by Ted Taylor, who remembers this as the document that "turned on the Air Force," including Mike May, later director of Livermore, who said "it was the best progress report he had ever seen." It remains classified S-RD. "It only covers the first year; but if I had to choose one document for declassification, that would be the one," says Ted.

Michael Treshow devoted his attention to everything from shock absorbers to parametric design studies that laid out the broad range of possible vehicles, from 200 to 10,000 tons. His drawings, few of which have been declassified, are remembered as exquisitely detailed. "The ship was about 120 feet high it was big, like a ten-story building," says Freeman, describing the earliest version. "It was just a big flat dome, it wasn't particularly aerodynamic. It was so heavy it did not matter. The bottom 20 feet or so were mostly shock absorbers and then above that you had machinery borrowed from the Coca-Cola Company for the handling of the bombs, like a Coke machine where you put in a quarter and get out a Coke bottle. The bombs are arranged in racks and are shunted along; as each one was used the next one would move in. They came in a regular sequence and then they would get snapped into the catapult that launched them down the middle. So that occupied the next 30 feet or so. And then above that you had the dining room and sleeping quarters for the crew."

A successful Orion launch would depend upon being able to select exactly the right flavor of bomb at exactly the right time. Although the link to Coca-Cola may have become exaggerated, bottle-handing equipment was definitely involved. "Oh yes, the Coca-Cola people did come," confirms Freeman. "We had interesting conversations with a lot of people, and many of them had to be in an unclassified context," says Ted. "One major source of information was the Coca-Cola Company, where we got detailed descriptions of how they set up mass production systems for Coke bottles and all kinds of mechanical stuff." Jerry Astl remembers the ejection system with Michael Treshow. "I saw the drawings and we discussed it. I agreed with him one hundred percent. He didn't design that, he said, why should I bother? Vending machines already have something like that, and it works and is well proven. All we need is to make a few changes to make it sturdier, and what he had was pretty damm good-looking."

== Patents ==
Michael has several patents:

- Reflector control of a boiling water reactor
- Fuel subassembly construction for radial flow in a nuclear reactor
- Kiln supporting means
- Device for curing and cooling burned materials in rotary kilns
- A Preliminary Study of Superheating Boiling Reactors
- A study of heavy water central station boiling reactors
- Nuclear reactor
- Design study of small boiling reactors for power and heat production (November 1954)
- Design study of a nuclear power plant for 100-kw electric and 400-kw heat capacity (May 1955)
- ALPR preliminary design study (April 1956)
- A study of heavy water central station boiling reactors (CSBR) (September 1958)
- Design of the Argonne Low Power Reactor (ALPR) (May 1961)

== Death ==
Michael died on 26 January 1986 at 91 years old.
