= Casaba-Howitzer =

US 1960s-era study into nuclear weapons to create beams of plasma

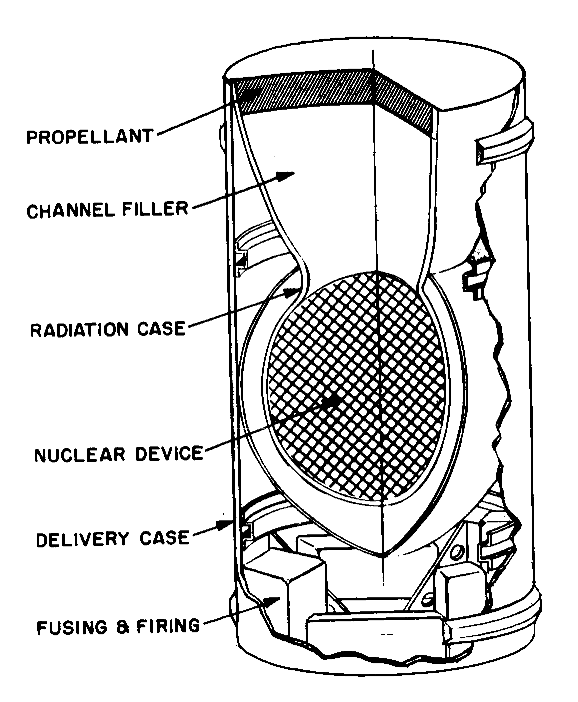
A Casaba-Howitzer weapon would be almost identical to this nuclear pulse propulsion unit. The explosive charge ablatively vaporizes the disk at the top, propelling the resulting plasma towards the target.

Project Casaba-Howitzer was a 1960s-era study into the use of nuclear weapons as the drivers for intense beams of plasma for use in space warfare. The basic concept grew out of work on the Project Orion spaceship concept, which studied nuclear shaped charges.

Very little information about Casaba-Howitzer is known publicly, limited primarily to mentions in defense spending documents during the mid-1960s (as part of the larger Project Defender), and once again in the mid-1980s when the concepts were revived as part of the Strategic Defense Initiative.

== Description ==
=== Project Orion ===
The design for Project Orion originally used small hydrogen bombs whose explosion ejecta was captured on a pusher plate, a large metal plate mounted on shock absorbers. The explosion of the bomb was spherical and it was only the portion that struck the plate that created thrust. Moving the plate closer to the bomb increased the subtended angle that was captured, and thus efficiency, but at the cost of greatly increasing mechanical stress and added pusher plate weight. Baseline designs captured perhaps 10% of the energy of the bomb, a large waste. This led to considerable attention to this problem, and eventually a custom atomic bomb design for this purpose.

A conventional hydrogen bomb includes two stages; the primary is an atomic bomb normally based on plutonium, while the secondary is a mixture of fusion fuel and various boosters. The primary releases an intense burst of X-rays that heat channel filler materials (believed to be similar to styrofoam) surrounding the secondary. The heat and pressure of the x-rays and their interactions causes the secondary to implode, compressing and heating the assembly to the conditions needed for nuclear fusion to occur.

For the Project Orion redesign, the team removed the secondary and replaced the channel filler with beryllium oxide, which is more opaque to x-rays. On the far side of the channel filler, they placed a plate of tungsten. When the primary is triggered, the beryllium oxide heats up to millions of degrees, passing this heat into the back of the tungsten plate. The tungsten is vaporized and sent flying off the end of the bomb as a plasma in a fan about 22.5 degrees wide. This plasma is captured by the pusher plate for thrust, capturing perhaps 85% of the total momentum. These propulsion modules were, in effect, nuclear shaped charges.

=== Weapon use ===
The idea behind weaponizing the Orion modules is credited to Morris "Moe" Scharff, who moved to General Atomics from Lawrence Livermore National Laboratory. The name comes from the casaba melon, a variety of honeydew, because the lab was "on a melon kick that year," naming various projects after melons and having already used up all the good ones. Development for weapon use is straightforward; for Casaba the tungsten was replaced with a lightweight material that would provide higher jet velocity, while at the same time thinning the plate to reduce the dispersion angle. This would produce a narrow, high-velocity jet. A wide variety of different jet types could be produced with different materials.

In general terms, the Casaba-Howitzer concepts are somewhat similar to X-ray lasers studied under Project Excalibur during the 1980s. These replaced the pusher plate material with metal rods; when optically pumped by the atomic bomb's X-rays, the rods would theoretically produce collimated beams of X-ray radiation in the same fashion that a ruby laser produces red light when pumped by a flashtube. Testing in the 1980s demonstrated the efficiency was far too low to be useful and further work was dropped.

ARPA funding for Casaba-Howitzer continued for a time after the original Orion project at General Atomics ended, but when it shut down a number of the original team members left the company for other work. Notable among these was Scharff, who had developed most of the ablation theory, who left to form S-Cubed. The concept got a second lease on life during the Strategic Defense Initiative in the 1980s, but unclassified details are lacking.
