= Charles Loomis =

Charles Loomis may refer to:

- Charles Battell Loomis (1861–1911), American author
- Charles Clark Loomis (1921–2011), mathematical physicist
