= Nuclear shaped charge =

Explosive device that focuses nuclear fission reactions on a target

Nuclear shaped charges refers to nuclear weapons that focus the energy of their explosion into certain directions, as opposed to a spherical explosion. Edward Teller referred to such concepts as third-generation weapons, the first generation being the atom bomb and the second the H-bomb.

The basic concept has been raised on several occasions, with the first known references being part of the Project Orion nuclear-powered spacecraft project in the 1960s. This used beryllium oxide to convert the X-rays released by a small bomb into longer wavelength radiation, which explosively vaporized a tamper material, normally tungsten, causing it to carry away much of the bomb's energy as kinetic energy in the form of tungsten plasma. The same concept was explored as a weapon in the Casaba/Howitzer proposals.

The ideas were explored by Los Alamos National Laboratory as part of the Strategic Defense Initiative.

== Studies and tests ==
Project Orion researched the possibility of nuclear shaped charges being used as weapons in space warfare. These weapons would have yields of a few kilotons, could convert about 50% of that energy into a plasma jet with a velocity of 280 kilometers per second, and could theoretically get beam angles as low as 0.1 radians (5.73 degrees), quite wide but considerably narrower than the propulsion unit.

The nuclear shaped charge concept was also studied extensively in the 1980s as part of Project Prometheus, along with bomb-pumped lasers. Using a combination of explosive wave-shaping and "gun-barrel" design, up to 5% of a small nuclear bomb could reportedly be converted into kinetic energy driving a beam of particles with a beam angle of 0.001 radians (0.057 degrees), far more concentrated than the earlier-proposed plasma jet, though this decreases to 1% efficiency at 50 kilotons (half a kiloton of energy in the beam) and efficiency suffers greatly at even higher yields. There has only been one known nuclear shaped charge test, conducted in 1985 as part of Operation Grenadier. During the test, codenamed 'Chamita', the intent was to use a nuclear detonation to accelerate a one-kilogram mass of tungsten at one hundred kilometers per second, in the form of small particles focused in a cone-shaped beam. The test succeeded in propelling one kilogram of tungsten/molybdenum particles to seventy kilometers per second, corresponding to the energy of about 0.59 tons of TNT. As the yield of the detonated nuclear device was 8 kilotons, this came out to only 0.007% efficiency.

Princeton nuclear physicist Dan L. Fenstermacher stated that there is a fundamental problem associated with the Casaba Howitzer concept that becomes dire at higher yields: a good portion of the bomb's energy inevitably becomes black-body radiation, which would quickly overtake the propelled mass. This poses the risk that most of the particles will be vaporized or even ionized, rendering them useless for dealing damage to the target. He concluded: "The NKEW concept is thus one that may 'require' subkiloton explosives to be feasible... Whatever the case may be, it is clear that demonstrating a rush of hypervelocity pellets from a nuclear blast, while perhaps impressive, in no way guarantees that a useful weapon will ever be derived from this concept."
