= James Nance =

James Nance may refer to:

- James J. Nance (1900–1984), American industrialist
- James C. Nance (1893–1984), American state legislator and newspaper publisher
- James C. Nance (scientist) (1927–2019), American scientist
- James W. Nance (1921–1999), United States Navy officer and congressional aide
- James D. Nance, Confederate colonel of the American Civil War
- Jim Nance (1942–1992), American football player

== See also ==
- James C. Nance Memorial Bridge, Oklahoma, United States
