= Jerry Astl =

Distinguished Czech aeronautical engineer and explosives engineer

Jaromír "Jerry" Astl
- Born: Jaromír Astl; 23 September 1922; Most, Czechoslovakia
- Died: 16 October 2017 (aged 95); Solana Beach, California, U.S.
- Citizenship: United States
- Known for: C4 explosives
- Spouse: Giselle Astl
- Scientific career
- Fields: Aeronautical engineer

Jaromír Astl, better known as Jerry Astl (23 September 1922 – 16 October 2017), was a Czech aeronautical engineer and explosive engineer who helped design the American Project Orion nuclear propulsion spacecraft in the 1950s and 1960s.

== Career ==
Astl was born in Most, Czechoslovakia on 23 September 1922. After earning a degree in aeronautics in German-occupied Czechoslovakia, he worked as an engineer on the development of the Messerschmitt Me 262 Schwalbe jet fighter during World War II. At the same, Astl was a member of the Czech resistance movement involved in sabotaging communication lines with high explosives. He eventually went underground and joined the resistance movement full-time until the end of war. Following the war, Astl came under suspicion of dissidence by the new communist government and he eventually escaped through Soviet-occupied Austria. Astl arrived in the United States in April 1949 and worked in Baltimore, Maryland at a series of odd jobs including in a shoe factory, a printing plant and as a movie theater projectionist. In 1955, he obtained American citizenship and moved to the San Diego, California where he was employed as an aeronautical engineer with Rohr, Inc. working on the Lockheed Electra. He then moved to Ryan Aeronautical and Douglas Aircraft Company to work on the DC-8.

Asti was hired by General Atomic after it received funding to develop Project Orion.

== Project Orion ==
Astl's work on Project Orion included three papers: Multi-ICBM Weapon System (November 1959), Nuclear Pulse-Propelled Vehicle Launching System (May 1960) and Split-Cylinder Long-Stroke Shock Absorber System (February 1961). His other major contribution was a proposed high-explosive test facility on the bluffs above La Jolla at Torrey Pines, San Diego. Jerry worked alongside Morris Scharff and Brian Dunne on the explosive experiments for Project Orion.

== Later career ==
Astl left General Atomic in 1972 and became an independent consultant. He owns several patents, which include "Electromagnetic forming element" and "Differential pressure gauge".

== Later life ==
He later lived in Solana Beach, where he died on 16 October 2017 at the age of 95.

== Media appearances ==
- History Undercover: Code Name Project Orion (1999)
- To Mars by A-Bomb: The Secret History of Project Orion (BBC, 2003)

== Bibliography ==
- Dyson, Freeman J. (April 15, 1981). Disturbing The Universe. Sloan Foundation Science Series. Basic Books. p. 112. ISBN 978-0465016778.
- Dyson, George (2002). Project Orion : the true story of the atomic spaceship (1. ed.). New York: Henry Holt and Co. pp. 132–144. ISBN 9780805059854.
