= Burt Freeman =

American physicist

- Born: July 3, 1924; Pasadena, California
- Died: October 4, 2016 (aged 92); Kihei, Hawaii
- Occupation: Physicist

Burton Edgar Freeman (July 3, 1924 – October 4, 2016) was an American physicist and explosive engineer who researched the calculated expedition timetables for the American Project Orion nuclear propulsion spacecraft in the 1950s and 60s. He calculated timetables for round trips to Mars and Venus.

== Early Life and Education ==
He was born in Pasadena, California on July 31th, 1924, the only child of Edgar Keep and Lelia Grace Freeman, and grew up in San Dimas, California. He served as an officer for the V-12 U.S. Navy College Training Program during World War II. He then embarked upon an educational path that included graduation from Caltech in 1945 with a B.S. in physics, followed by a M.S. from UCLA, culminating with a Ph.D. in theoretical physics from Yale University in 1950.

Freeman had married high school classmate Elizabeth (Betty) Louise Forrest in 1946. Immediately after graduation from Yale the couple and their two children moved to Los Alamos, New Mexico, where he worked at Los Alamos Scientific Laboratory as a nuclear physicist.

== Project Orion and Later Work ==
In 1958 the Freeman family, now with four children, returned to California. He joined General Atomics in La Jolla, working to design and develop a nuclear powered spaceship with the Project Orion team. He later commented that "In retrospect Orion was a really crazy idea. A great deal of force of personality and intellect drove this project".

In 1967 he became a principal founder of Systems, Science and Software (S-Cubed), an advanced scientific research facility in San Diego. He then served as a principal scientist at Science Applications International, then at Physical Dynamics Inc., and at Maxwell Technologies. His forte was envisioning and building complex, computer-based mathematical models of complicated physical processes (e.g., atmospheric physics).

== Personal Life and Retirement ==
Outside of work, Burt was an avid tennis player into his mid-80’s. He was an avid gardener and landscaped the grounds of two homes in La Jolla. After he retired, he undertook volunteer work, evaluating the ideas of local water districts and sharing a scientific viewpoint about them that could affect their plans and decisions.

Betty died in May 2013. Freeman remained in San Diego until 2015, when he moved to Kihei, Hawaii and remained there until his death on October 4, 2016. He was survived by six of his seven children, and five grandchildren.
