= James C. Nance (scientist) =

American scientist (1927–2019)

- Born: August 22, 1927; Arkansas, USA
- Died: January 14, 2019 (aged 91); Englewood, Florida, USA
- Occupation: Orion's project director

James C. Nance (August 22, 1927 – January 14, 2019) was an American scientist who served as the Orion Project's director. Nance worked alongside Ted Taylor to declassify papers on Orion to ensure the military could adopt the project.

Born in Arkansas in 1927, Nance came to General Atomic in 1960, after seven years as a project engineer on the Aircraft Nuclear Propulsion program at Convair aircraft in Fort Worth, where as part of the flight-test crew for the Aircraft Shield Test Reactor, he was the first person to operate a nuclear reactor in the air. After three years as Ted's assistant, he became the manager of Project Orion in the fall of 1963, remaining at its helm until the end.

Nance died on January 14, 2019.
