= Edward B. Giller =

United States Air Force general

Edward Bonfoy Giller
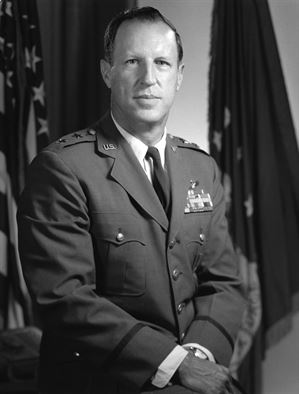
- Born: July 8, 1918; Jacksonville, Illinois, United States
- Died: October 1, 2017 (aged 99); Bernalillo, New Mexico, United States
- Military career
- Allegiance: United States
- Branch: United States Air Force
- Service years: 1941–1972
- Rank: Major General
- Commands: Air Force Special Weapons Center; 343d Fighter Squadron
- Conflicts: World War II
- Awards: Air Force Distinguished Service Medal; Silver Star; Legion of Merit (2); Distinguished Flying Cross (2); Purple Heart; Air Medal (18)

Edward Bonfoy Giller (July 8, 1918 – October 1, 2017) was a United States Air Force (USAF) major general who served as the assistant general manager for military application, United States Atomic Energy Commission, Germantown, Maryland. Giller was assistant director and then director of the Research Directorate for the Air Force Special Weapons Center at Kirtland Air Force Base in the 1950s and 60s. He was the USAF Liaison officer for the Project Orion.

== Personal life ==
Giller was born in Jacksonville, Illinois, on 8 July 1918. He grew up in White Hall, Illinois. He attended Kemper Military School in Missouri for his last two years of high school. In 1940, he obtained a Bachelor of Science degree in chemical engineering from University of Illinois, where he was a member of Gamma Zeta chapter of Alpha Tau Omega fraternity. He worked for Sinclair Oil Refining Company in Houston, TX until the advent of WWII.

== World War II ==
Giller served as a P-38J Lightning and P-51D Mustang fighter pilot with the 343d Fighter Squadron, 55th Fighter Group, for the United States Army Air Force during World War II. His P-38 and all four of his Mustangs were named "The Millie G", for his wife, airline stewardess Mildred, and coded 'CY-G'. He served as commanding officer of the 343d, and later, as deputy commander of the 55th. He had three confirmed kills, including a Messerschmitt Me 262 over Munich on 9 April 1945. Giller also had six credited ground kills and two damaged. He was wounded when his cockpit was hit by flak over Munich on 16 April 1945 – he flew two hours to the UK with one arm.

Giller's military decorations and awards include the Silver Star, Legion of Merit with oak leaf cluster, Distinguished Flying Cross with oak leaf cluster, Air Medal with 17 oak leaf clusters, Purple Heart, Distinguished Unit Citation Emblem, and the French Croix de Guerre.

== Career ==
Between 1954 and 1959 he was the special assistant director and later the director of the Research Directorate, Air Force Special Weapons Center, Kirtland Air Force Base, New Mexico.

== Project Orion ==
Giller was the USAF Liaison officer for the Project Orion nuclear powered spacecraft.

== Death ==
Giller died in October 2017 at the age of 99. He was married to his wife, the former Mildred Schmidt, of Grants Pass, Oregon, for 69 years until her death 16 November 2012. They had five children.

== Media appearances ==
- To Mars by A-Bomb: The Secret History of Project Orion (BBC, 2003)
