= Brian Dunne =

- Born: January 8, 1924; Santa Fe, New Mexico
- Died: November 30, 2017 (aged 93); La Jolla, United States
- Occupation: Aeronautical Engineer
- Title: Orion's chief scientist

Brian Boru Dunne II (January 8, 1924 - November 30, 2017) was Project Orion's chief scientist. Dunne worked on explosive model tests in Point Loma, San Diego alongside Jerry Astl and Morris Scharff. He continued to work for General Atomics and later started his own firm called Ship Systems.

== Project Orion ==
Dunne was the chief experimental scientist on Project Orion. He worked on Project Orion as an experimentalist. Dunne and Howard Kratz set up a facility for firing explosive-driven plasma jets as sample pusher-plate targets, after explosive-driven flights were cancelled.

== Accomplishments ==
While working at General Atomics Dunne was part of a team of scientists led by Freeman Dyson that designed the TRIGA class of research nuclear reactors. The TRIGA class reactors is the most widely used non-power nuclear reactor with 66 installed across 24 different countries. Beyond the nuclear projects, Dunne also helped conduct early experiments on supersonic liquid jets, including research where shock wave pressure was used to propel liquid out of a lake.

== Media appearances ==
- History Undercover: Code Name Project Orion (1999)
- To Mars by A-Bomb: The Secret History of Project Orion (BBC, 2003)
