= Don Prickett =

American military officer (1919-2004)

Donald Irwin Prickett
- Born: Donald Irwin Prickett; July 16, 1919; Irricana, Alberta, Canada
- Died: February 3, 2004 (aged 84); Clarkdale, Arizona

Donald Irwin Prickett (1919-2004) was a United States Air Force (USAF) Colonel who served as the research director for the Air Force Special Weapons Center at Kirtland Air Force Base in the 1950s and 1960s. He was the USAF Liaison officer for the Project Orion.

== Personal life ==
Prickett was born in Irricana, Alberta, Canada on July 16, 1919.

== World War II ==
Prickett served as a bomber pilot for the United States Air Force during World War II. After studying nuclear physics at Ohio State University, he worked at the Pentagon on research and development of nuclear power.

== Career ==
Prickett was then assigned to Kirtland Air Force Base where he became the research director for the Air Force Special Weapons Center, particularly in relation to the use of nuclear power. Prickett was a program director for tests of the hydrogen bombs, such as Castle Bravo. According to Prickett, he was present for more than 100 atmospheric tests of nuclear bombs in Nevada and the South Pacific between 1951 and 1963, and stated he received the maximum dosage of two Rads radiation every series.

== Project Orion ==
Pickett was the USAF Liaison officer for the Project Orion nuclear powered spacecraft.

== Star Trek ==
Prickett was also a friend of Gene Roddenberry, they having served together in the USAF during World War II. When Roddenberry was developing and pitching the idea for Star Trek in 1964, he initially contacted Prickett for help as a technical advisor. Prickett wrote to RAND Corporation scientists on Roddenberry's behalf which resulted in Harvey P. Lynn Jr, a RAND Corporation physicist, serving as scientific adviser for Star Trek's pilot episode, "The Cage".

== Later career ==
Pickett retired from the military in 1967.

== Death ==
He died on February 3, 2004, in Clarkdale, Arizona at the age of 84. He was married for 61 years to his wife, Mary, with whom he had three children.

== Media appearances ==
- To Mars by A-Bomb: The Secret History of Project Orion (BBC, 2003)
