= Helios (propulsion system) =

Design for spacecraft propulsion system

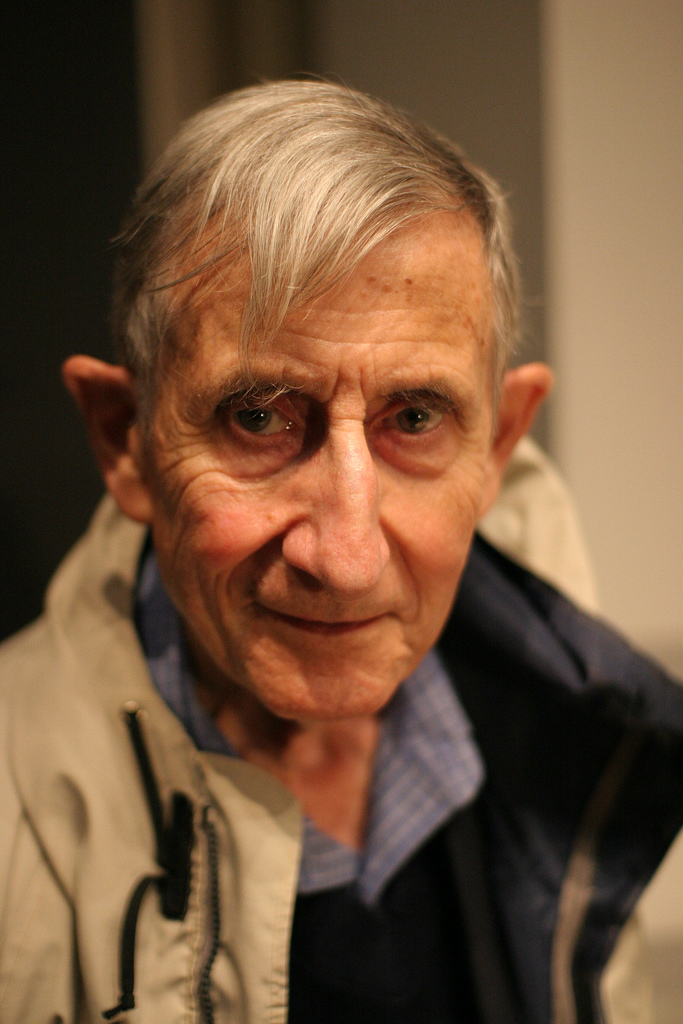
Freeman Dyson in 2005

Helios is a design for a spacecraft propulsion system such that small (0.1 kiloton) nuclear bombs would be detonated in a chamber roughly 30 feet (9.1 m) in diameter. Water would be injected into the chamber, super-heated by the explosion and expelled for thrust. It was a precursor concept to the Orion project. Like Orion, it would have achieved constant acceleration through rapid "pulsed" operation.

This design would have yielded a specific impulse of about 1150 seconds (compared to a modern chemical rocket's 450 seconds). However, a number of technical problems existed, most prominently how to keep the combustion chamber from exploding from the great pressures of the atomic detonations.

The Helios propulsion system was originally conceived by Freeman Dyson.

== See also ==
- Operation Plumbbob (1957), nuclear fission explosion test with steel plate experiment for Pascal-B
