= Charles Clark Loomis =

Mathematical physicist (1921–2011)

Charles C. Loomis
- Born: February 26, 1921
- Died: July 14, 2011 (aged 90)
- Occupation: Physicist

Charles Clark Loomis (February 26, 1921 - July 14, 2011) was a mathematical physicist on Project Orion.

Loomis joined General Atomics division of General Dynamics Corporation at the John Jay Hopkins Laboratory for Pure and Applied Science, San Diego, California.

== Project Orion ==
Loomis, was a mathematical physicist from Los Alamos, who helped Ted Taylor with his ideas for Project Orion. He was in charge of General Atomic's first computers. Loomis's office was next door to Taylor's. Taylor told him about the sense of discouragement because Orion was so big, but he said "Well, think big! If it isn't big, it's the wrong concept. What's wrong with it being big?" it was this discussion that everything flipped for Project Orion. It was Loomis's call that if you were serious about exploring the Solar System, who not use something the size of the Queen Mary? He understood that bombs could in principle do it. Loomis is listed on a report indicating he had worked on the meter model tests.

== Later career ==
Charles Loomis joined S-Cubed after Project Orion was cancelled.

== Death ==
Loomis died on July 14, 2011.
