= Ronald F. Prater =

Ronald Funk Prater
- Born: August 11, 1934; Chicago, Illinois
- Died: November 17, 2004 (aged 70); Alexandria, Virginia
- Occupation: USAF Liaison

Ron Prater was part of a small "Space Warfare Analysis" team for Project Orion.

Ron Prater was born on 11 October 1934 in Chicago, Illinois. He lived with his parents until graduation from college in 1956. He married his wife, Ellen, in August 1956. His interests included stamp collecting, tennis, bowling, photography and reading. In reference to his working life, his resumé specifically mentioned focusing on the U.S. space program, including such projects as military application studies and advanced space hardware research.

== Education ==
He received his high school education at Lyons Township high school, La Grange, Illinois, and graduated in June 1952. He stood in the top 10% of his class. He attended Grinnel College, Grinnel, Iowa, and graduated in June 1956 with a B.A. degree. His major subject was physics and his minor was in economics. On the basis of his high school record and college entrance board examination scores, he was awarded a prize scholarship in physics by Grinnell upon his entrance in the fall of 1952.

He participated in AFROTC during his four years of college and was commissioned a second lieutenant, USAF, on graduation. After receiving his undergraduate degree, he was chosen to participate in the Hughes Aircraft company's "Cooperative Fellowship Program for the Master of Science Degree," under which he worked part time as a member of the Hughes technical staff and attended graduate school of California at Los Angeles on a part-time basis. On 12 June 1958 he graduated from UCLA, with a Master of Science in Applied Physics.

== Career ==
Prior to completion of his undergraduate work, his experience was limited to that gained in part-time employment as a salesman and bookkeeper during the summer. On employment by Hughes Aircraft Company, he participated in their "Airborne Systems Laboratories Rotation Training Program" for about eighteen months. During this time he had four separate assignments in various branches including work on radar transmitters, airborne digital computer programming, technical writing and systems engineers. After completing the rotation program, he continued his last assignment for an additional six months until called to active duty with the USAF. This assignment in "systems engineering" was concerned with the integration of the F-106 fire control system and the weapons used by that aircraft. Prater was involved with the analysis of aircraft-missile compatibility requirements, writing of test procedures, design of electronic test equipment, and general liaison to insure overall weapon system compatibility.

== Project Orion ==
Immediately on being called to active duty in the U.S. Air Force in August 1958, he was assigned as Assistant Project Officer on Project Orion (Putt-Putt) in the Research Directorate of the Air Force Special Weapons Center (AFSWC), Kirtland AFB, New Mexico.

His duties in this capacity have been quite varied and included evaluations of the technical research performed by the contractor and formulation of future research programs based on the evaluations, presentation of future programs to higher headquarters and the management of routine administration connected to the project. In addition he participated in the technical evaluation of contractor proposals and had served as technical advisor during contract negotiations.

Lieutenant Ron Prater and Captains Don Mixon and Fred Gorschboth, operated as a small "Space Warfare Analysis" team. Their efforts caught the attention of the most senior officers and resulted in the USAF proposing that Orion-style craft be fully funded—included preliminary designs during the development of the 1962 Air Force Space Program.

Prater had presented briefings on the study results and on the technical aspects of Project Orion at various contractor and Air Force installations. It was during this time he became familiar with nuclear weapons, new weapon developments and weapon effects.

== Later life ==
Prater obtained a doctorate in 1970 from AFIT in aerospace physics. Worked on Air Force Lazer Lab, Air Force Weapons Lab, DARPA in Washington, D.C., Star Wars, Lazer Defense System.

== Death ==
Prater died on 17 November 2004 in Alexandria, Virginia. He is buried along with his wife Ellen at Arlington National Cemetery.
