= Edward Creutz =

American physicist (1913–2009)

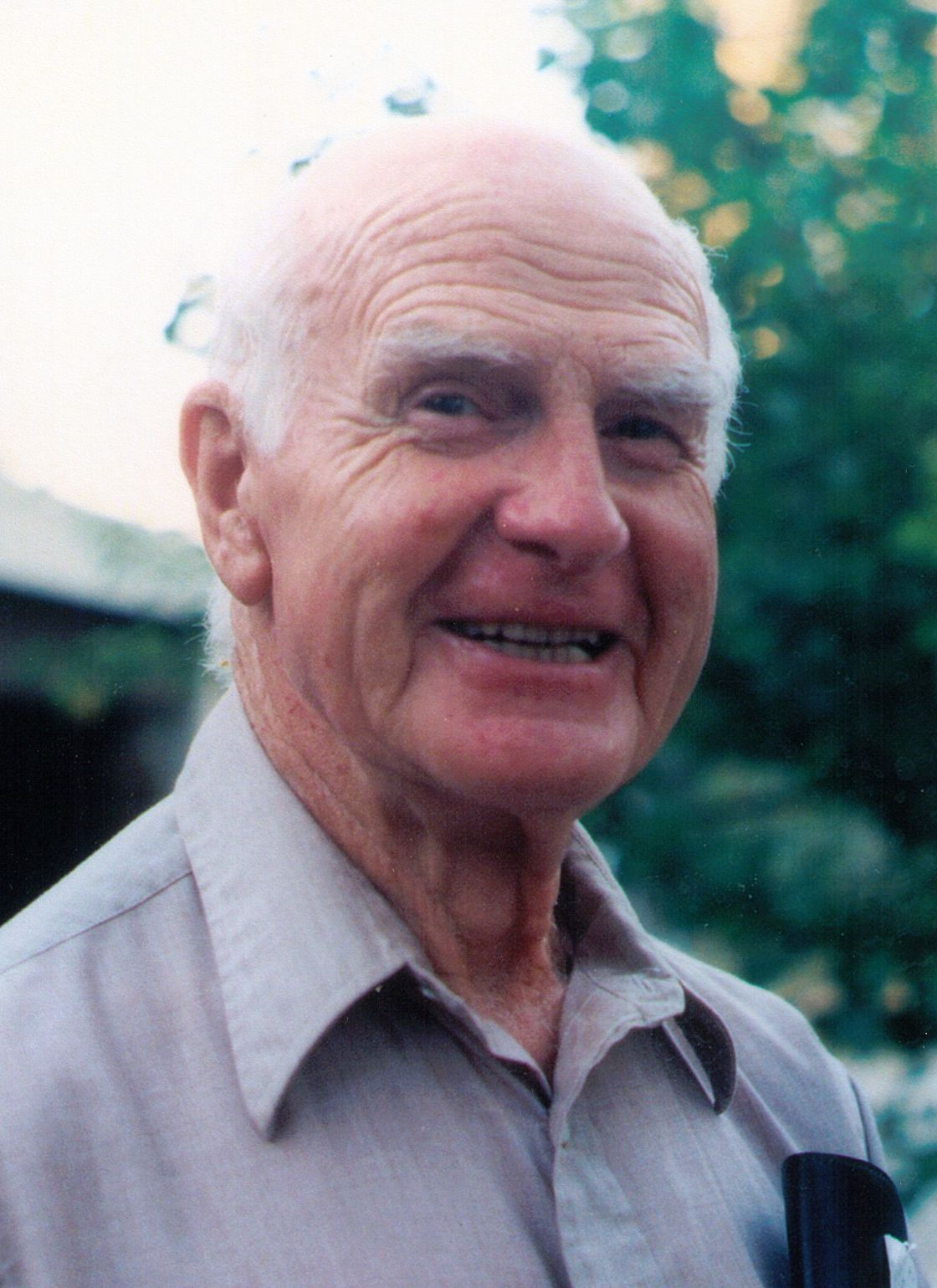
- Creutz in later life
- Born: January 23, 1913; Beaver Dam, Wisconsin
- Died: June 27, 2009 (aged 96); Rancho Santa Fe, California
- Citizenship: American
- Education: University of Wisconsin–Madison (B.S. 1936, Ph.D. 1939)
- Scientific career
- Fields: Nuclear physics
- Workplaces: Metallurgical Laboratory; Los Alamos Laboratory; Carnegie Institute of Technology; General Atomics
- Thesis: Resonance Scattering of Protons by Lithium (1939)
- Doctoral advisor: Gregory Breit

Edward Creutz (January 23, 1913 – June 27, 2009) was an American physicist who worked on the Manhattan Project at the Metallurgical Laboratory and the Los Alamos Laboratory during World War II. After the war he became a professor of physics at the Carnegie Institute of Technology. He was Vice President of Research at General Atomics from 1955 to 1970. He published over 65 papers on botany, physics, mathematics, metallurgy and science policy, and held 18 patents relating to nuclear energy.

A graduate of the University of Wisconsin–Madison, Creutz helped Princeton University build its first cyclotron. During World War II he worked on nuclear reactor design under Eugene Wigner at the Metallurgical Laboratory, designing the cooling system for the first water-cooled reactors. He led a group that studied the metallurgy of uranium and other elements used in reactor designs. In October 1944, he moved to the Los Alamos Laboratory, where he became a group leader.

After the war ended, Creutz accepted an offer to come to the Carnegie Institute of Technology, where he became the head of its physics department and its nuclear research center in 1948. In 1955 he returned to Los Alamos to evaluate its thermonuclear fusion program for the Atomic Energy Commission. While there he accepted an offer to become vice president for research and development and the director of its John Jay Hopkins Laboratory for Pure and Applied Science at General Atomics. Under his leadership, General Atomics developed TRIGA, a nuclear reactor for universities and laboratories.

Creutz served as an assistant director of the National Science Foundation from 1970 to 1977, and then as director of the Bernice Pauahi Bishop Museum in Honolulu, where he took particular interest in the museum's preparation of a Manual of the Flowering Plants of Hawaii.

== Early life ==
Creutz was born on January 23, 1913, in Beaver Dam, Wisconsin, the son of Lester Creutz, a high school history teacher, and Grace Smith Creutz, a general science teacher. He had two older brothers, John and Jim, and a younger sister, Edith. The family moved to Eau Claire, Wisconsin, in 1916, Monroe, Wisconsin, in 1920, and to Janesville, Wisconsin, in 1927. He played a number of musical instruments, including the mandolin, ukulele and trombone. He played in the school bands at Janesville High School and Monroe High School. At Janesville he played tenor banjo in a dance orchestra called Rosie's Ragadors, and timpani with the school orchestra at Monroe. He also played left guard on the American football teams at Janesville and Monroe. He expressed an interest in chemistry, biology, geology and photography.

After graduating from Janesville High School in 1929, he took a job as a bookkeeper at a local bank. In 1932, his brother John, who had graduated from the University of Wisconsin–Madison with a degree in electrical engineering, persuaded him to go to college as well. John suggested that "if you aren’t sure what part of science you want, take physics, because that's basic to all of them." Creutz later recalled that this was the best advice he ever got. He entered the University of Wisconsin and studied mathematics and physics. Money was scarce during the Great Depression, especially after his father died in 1935. To pay his bills, Creutz worked as a dishwasher and short order cook, and took a job taking care of the physics laboratory equipment. In 1936, his senior year, he taught physics laboratory classes.

Creutz encountered several members of the faculty at the University of Wisconsin, including Julian Mack, Ragnar Rollefson, Raymond Herb, Eugene Wigner and Gregory Breit. Mack gave Creutz a research project to do in his junior year. Creutz remained at Wisconsin as a graduate student after receiving his Bachelor of Science (B.S.) degree in 1936, working for Herb upgrading the departmental Van de Graaff generator from 300 to 600 keV. With this done, the question became what to do with it, and Breit suggested that it had previously been observed that high-energy gamma rays were produced when lithium was bombarded with protons at 440 keV. Creutz therefore wrote his 1939 Doctor of Philosophy (Ph.D.) thesis on Resonance Scattering of Protons by Lithium, under Breit's supervision. Creutz married Lela Rollefson, a mathematics student at Wisconsin, and the sister of Ragnar Rollefson, on September 13, 1937. The couple had three children, two sons, Michael and Carl, and a daughter, Ann Jo.

Wigner moved to Princeton University in 1938, and soon after Creutz received an offer as well. Princeton had been given a 36-inch (910 mm) magnet by the University of California, which had been used to build an 8 MeV cyclotron. They wanted Creutz to help get it operational. He later recalled:

On my third day in Princeton I was invited to give a short report on my thesis work. There were usually two or three speakers at these "Journal Club" meetings. This time the speakers were Niels Bohr, Albert Einstein, and Ed Creutz. To be on the same program with these two giants of scientific accomplishments was breathtaking. Just before the meeting began, my sponsor, Delsasso, asked me, "Say, Creutz, have you met Einstein yet?" I had not. Delsasso took me over to where Einstein was sitting in sweatshirt and tennis shoes, and said, "Professor Einstein, this is Creutz who has come to work on our cyclotron." The great man held out his hand, which seemed as big as a dinner plate, and said in an accented voice, "I’m glad to meet you, Dr. Creutz." I managed to wheeze out, "I’m glad to meet you, too, Dr. Einstein."

But it was Bohr who electrified the audience with his news from Europe of the discovery by Lise Meitner and Otto Frisch of nuclear fission. Physicists rushed to confirm the results. Creutz built an ionization chamber and a linear amplifier out of radio vacuum tubes, coffee cans and motorcycle batteries, and with this apparatus the physicists at Princeton were able to confirm the results.

== World War II ==
In the early years of World War II between 1939 and 1941, Wigner led the Princeton group in a series of experiments involving uranium and two tons of graphite as a neutron moderator. In early 1942, Arthur Compton concentrated the Manhattan Project's various teams working on plutonium and nuclear reactor design, including Wigner's team from Princeton, at the Metallurgical Laboratory at the University of Chicago. The name was a codename; Creutz was the first to conduct actual metallurgy research, and he hired its first metallurgist to work with him.

Wigner led the Theoretical Group that included Creutz, Leo Ohlinger, Alvin M. Weinberg, Katharine Way and Gale Young. The group's task was to design the reactors that would convert uranium into plutonium. At the time, reactors existed only on paper, and no reactor had yet gone critical. In July 1942, Wigner chose a conservative 100 MW design, with a graphite neutron moderator and water cooling. The choice of water as a coolant was controversial at the time because water was known to absorb neutrons, thereby reducing the efficiency of the reactor; but Wigner was confident that his group's calculations were correct and that water would work, while the technical difficulties involved in using helium or liquid metal as a coolant would delay the project. Working seven days a week, the group designed the reactors between September 1942 and January 1943. Creutz studied the corrosion of metals in a water-cooled system, and designed the cooling system. In 1959 a patent for the reactor design would be issued in the name of Creutz, Ohlinger, Weinberg, Wigner, and Young.

As a group leader at the Metallurgical Laboratory, Creutz conducted studies of uranium and how it could be extruded into rods. His group looked into the process of corrosion in metals in contact with fast-flowing liquids, the processes for fabricating aluminium and jacketing uranium with it. It also investigated the forging of beryllium, and the preparation of thorium. Frederick Seitz and Alvin Weinberg later reckoned that the activities of Creutz and his group may have reduced the time taken to produce plutonium by up to two years.

The discovery of spontaneous fission in reactor-bred plutonium due to contamination by plutonium-240 led Wigner to propose switching to breeding uranium-233 from thorium, but the challenge was met by the Los Alamos Laboratory developing an implosion-type nuclear weapon design. In October 1944, Creutz moved to Los Alamos, where he became a group leader responsible for explosive lens design verification and preliminary testing. Difficulties encountered in testing the lenses led to the construction of a special test area in Pajarito Canyon, and Creutz became responsible for testing there. As part of the preparation for the Trinity nuclear test, Creutz conducted a test detonation at Pajarito Canyon without nuclear material. This test brought bad news; it seemed to indicate that the Trinity test would fail. Hans Bethe worked through the night to assess the results, and was able to report that the results were consistent with a perfect explosion.

== Later life ==
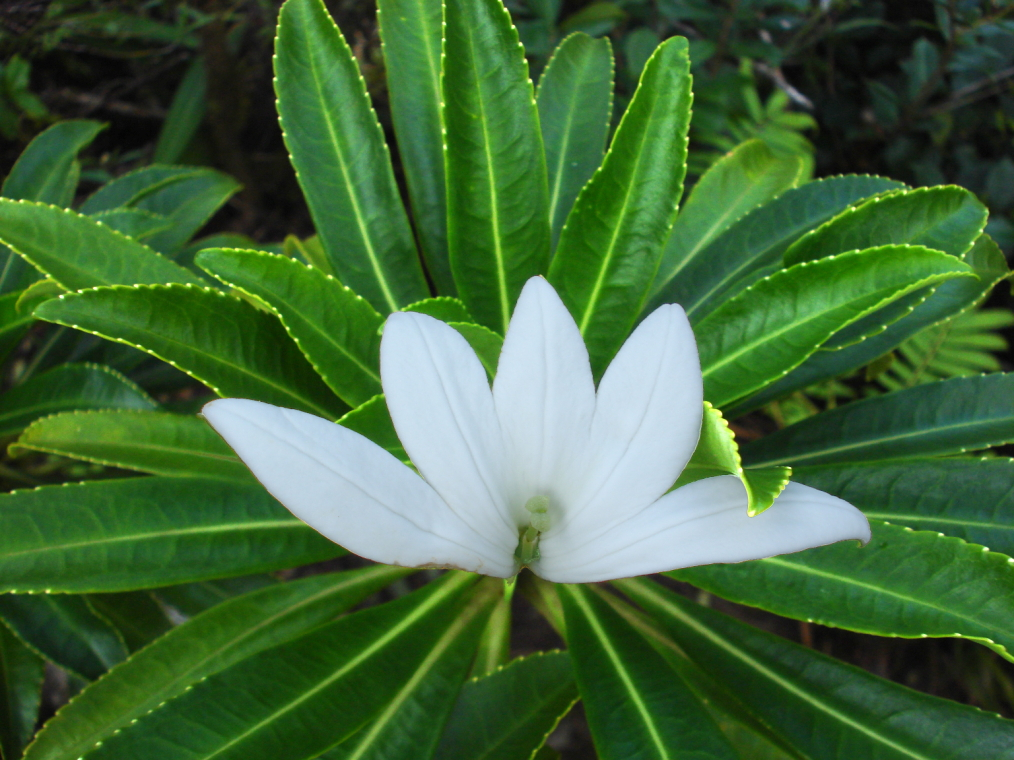
Apetahia raiateensis, a rare flower found only on Raiatea in French Polynesia. Creutz published a paper on it in 1966.

After the war ended in 1945, Creutz accepted an offer from Seitz to come to the Carnegie Institute of Technology as an associate professor, and help create a nuclear physics group there. Creutz in turn recruited a number of young physicists who had worked with him at Princeton and on the Manhattan Project in Chicago and Los Alamos, including Martyn Foss, Jack Fox, Roger Sutton and Sergio DeBenedetti. Together, with funding from the Office of Naval Research they built a 450 MeV synchrotron at the Nuclear Research Center near Saxonburg, Pennsylvania. For a time, This put them at the forefront of research into nuclear physics, allowing physicists there to study the recently discovered pi meson and mu meson. A visiting scholar, Gilberto Bernardini, created the first photographic emulsion of a meson.

Creutz became a professor, the head of the physics department, and the head of the nuclear research center at the Carnegie Institute of Technology in 1948. He was also a member of the executive board at the Argonne National Laboratory from 1946 to 1958, and a consultant at the Oak Ridge National Laboratory from 1946 to 1958. In addition to his work on nuclear physics, he cultivated flowers and orchids at his home. He published eight papers on floral species, and named three varieties of violets after his children. One 1966 paper, published in the New York Botanical Garden Journal was on Apetahia raiateensis, a rare flower found only on the island of Raiatea in French Polynesia. He travelled to Polynesia many times, and translated Grammar of the Tahitian language from French into English. His family served as hosts for a time to two young people from Tahiti and Samoa.

In 1955 and 1956, Creutz spent a year at Los Alamos evaluating its thermonuclear fusion program for the Atomic Energy Commission. While there he was approached by Frederic de Hoffmann, who recruited him to join the General Atomics division of General Dynamics. He moved to La Jolla, California, as its vice president for research and development, and was concurrently the director of its John Jay Hopkins Laboratory for Pure and Applied Science from 1955 to 1967. He was also a member of the Advisory Panel on General Science at the Department of Defense from 1959 to 1963.

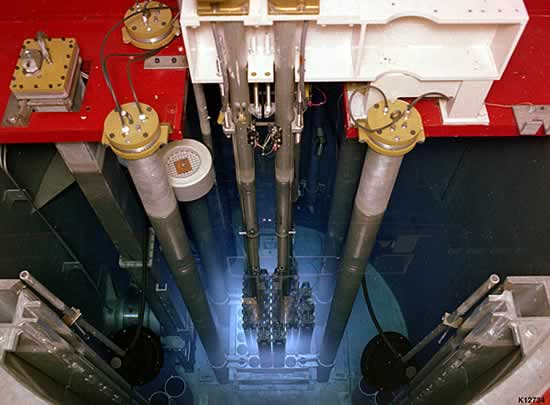
TRIGA is the world's most popular research reactor

Under his leadership, General Atomics developed TRIGA, a small reactor for universities and laboratories. TRIGA used uranium zirconium hydride (UZrH) fuel, which has a large, prompt negative fuel temperature coefficient of reactivity. As the temperature of the core increases, the reactivity rapidly decreases. It is thus highly unlikely, though not completely impossible, for a nuclear meltdown to occur. Due to its safety and reliability, which allows it to be installed in densely populated areas, and its ability to still generate high energy for brief periods, which is particularly useful for research, it became the world's most popular research reactor, and General Atomics sold 66 TRIGAs in 24 countries. The high-temperature gas-cooled reactor (HTGR) was less successful, and only two HTGR power reactors were built, both in the United States. The 40 MW Peach Bottom Unit 1 demonstration plant in Pennsylvania operated successfully, but the larger Fort St. Vrain 300 MW unit in Colorado encountered technical problems. General Atomics also conducted research into thermonuclear energy, including means of magnetically confining plasma. Between 1962 and 1974 Creutz published six papers on the subject.

In 1970 President Richard Nixon appointed Creutz as assistant director for research of the National Science Foundation. He became assistant director for mathematical and physicals sciences in 1975, and was acting deputy director from 1976 to 1977. The 1970s energy crisis raised the national profile of energy issues, and Creutz served on a panel that produced a study called The Nation's Energy Future. His wife Lela died of cancer in 1972. In 1974 he married Elisabeth Cordle, who worked for the National Science Board. The two of them enjoyed locating and photographing rare orchids.

His appointment at the National Science Foundation ended in 1977, and Creutz became director of the Bernice Pauahi Bishop Museum in Honolulu. He took particular interest in the museum's work preparing a two-volume Manual of the Flowering Plants of Hawaii, which was published in 1999. He expanded programs for education and outreach, and secured funding for two new buildings. He retired in 1987 and returned to his home in Rancho Santa Fe, California, and died there on June 27, 2009.

== Media appearances ==
- To Mars by A-Bomb: The Secret History of Project Orion (BBC, 2003)
