= Charles Battell Loomis =

American writer (1861–1911)

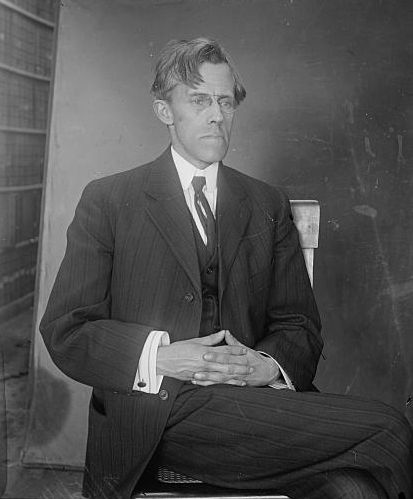
Charles Battell Loomis in 1910

Charles Battell Loomis (1861–1911) was an American writer.

== Biography ==
Loomis was born in Brooklyn, New York, and educated at the Polytechnic Institute there. He was in business from 1879 to 1891, but he gave it up to devote himself to the writing of magazine sketches and books much appreciated for their humor.

== Works ==
- Just Rhymes (1899)
- The Four-Masted Cat-Boat (1899)
- Yankee Enchantments (1900)
- A Partnership in Magic (1903)
- Cheerful Americans (1903)
- Araminta and the Automobile (1903)
- More Cheerful Americans (1904)
- I've Been Thinking (1905)
- Minerva's Manœuvres (1905)
- Cheer Up! (1906)
- A Bath in an English Tub (1907)
- Poe's "Raven" in an Elevator (1907) (the third edition of More Cheerful Americans)
- The Knack of It (1908)
- A Holiday Touch (1908)
- Just Irish (1909)
