= Project Orion (nuclear propulsion) =

Discontinued US research program on the viability of nuclear pulse propulsion

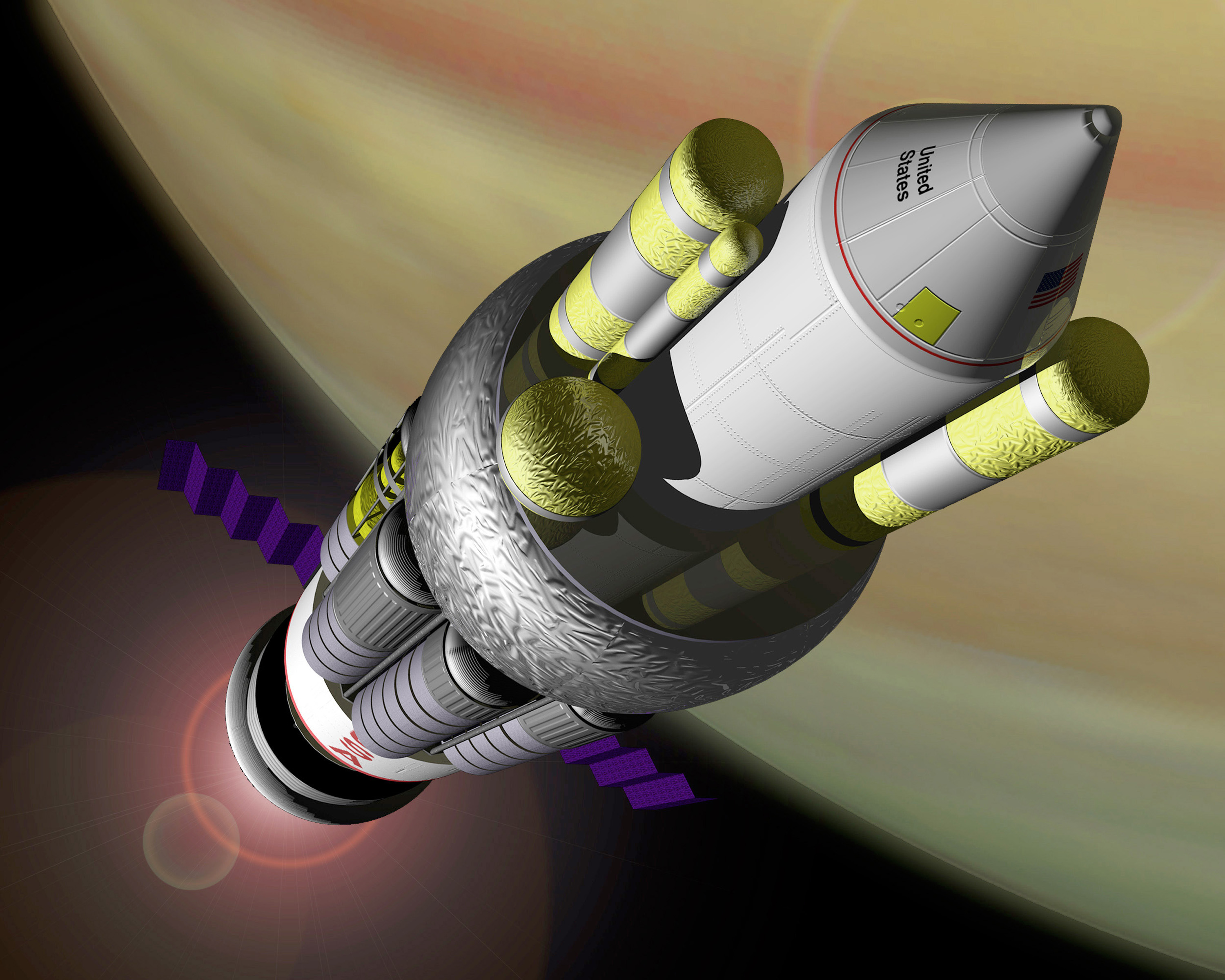
NASA artist rendering, from 1999, of the Project Orion pulsed nuclear fission spacecraft

Project Orion was a study conducted in the 1950s and 1960s by the United States Air Force, DARPA, and NASA into the viability of a nuclear pulse spaceship that would be directly propelled by a series of atomic explosions behind the craft. Following preliminary ideas in the 1940s and a classified paper co-authored by physicist Stanisław Ulam in 1955, DARPA (then known as ARPA) agreed to sponsor and fund the program in July 1958.

Early versions of the vehicle were designed for ground launch, but later versions were intended for use only in space. The design effort took place at General Atomics in San Diego, and supporters included Wernher von Braun, who issued a white paper advocating the idea. NASA also created a Mars mission profile based on the design, proposing a 125-day round trip carrying eight astronauts with a predicted development cost of $1.5 billion. Non-nuclear tests were conducted with models, with the most successful test occurring in late 1959, but the project was ultimately abandoned for reasons including the 1963 Partial Test Ban Treaty, which prohibited nuclear explosions in space amid concerns over radioactive fallout.

Physicists Ted Taylor and Freeman Dyson led the project, and Taylor has been described as the "driving force behind Orion". In 1979, General Dynamics donated a 26-inch-tall (66 cm) wooden model of the craft to the Smithsonian, which displays it at the Steven F. Udvar-Hazy Center in Fairfax County, Virginia.

== Background and planning ==
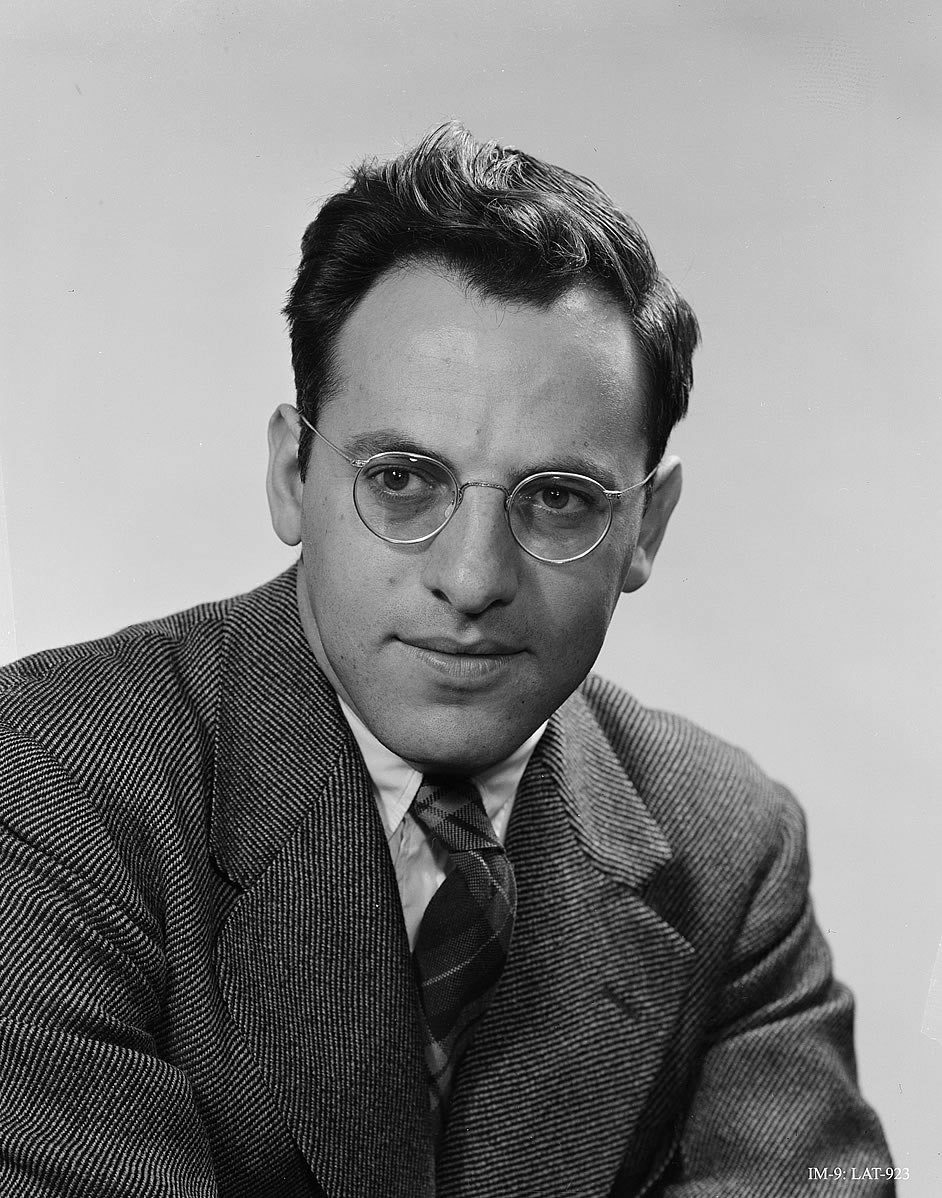
Frederick Reines, early 1950s, photo from Los Alamos

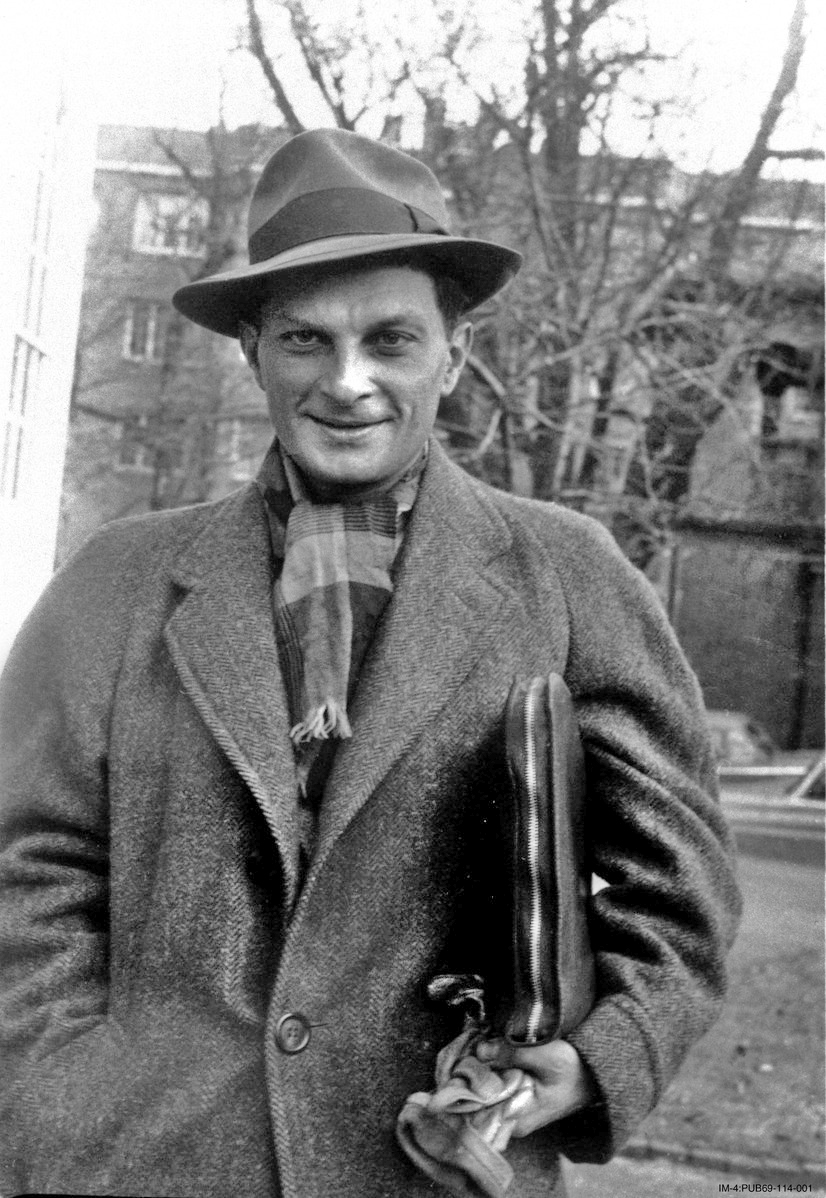
Stanisław Ulam, c. 1945, photo from Los Alamos

Physicist Stanislaw Ulam proposed the general idea of nuclear pulse propulsion in 1946, and preliminary calculations were made by Frederick Reines and Ulam in a Los Alamos memorandum dated 1947. In August 1955, Ulam co-authored a classified paper proposing the use of nuclear fission bombs, "ejected and detonated at a considerable distance", for propelling a vehicle in outer space. The project was led by Ted Taylor at General Atomics and physicist Freeman Dyson who, at Taylor's request, took a year away from the Institute for Advanced Study in Princeton to work on the project.

In July 1958, ARPA agreed to sponsor Orion at an initial level of $1 million per year, at which point the project received its name and formally began. The agency granted a study of the concept to the General Dynamics Corporation, but decided to withdraw support in late 1959. The U.S. Air Force agreed to support Orion if a military use was found for the project, and the NASA Office of Manned Spaceflight also contributed funding. The concept investigated by the government used a blast shield and shock absorber to protect the crew and convert the detonations into a continuous propulsion force. The most successful model test, in November 1959, reached roughly 100 meters in altitude with six sequenced chemical explosions. NASA also produced a Mars mission profile for a 125-day round trip with eight astronauts, at a predicted development cost of $1.5 billion. Orion was canceled in 1964, after the United States signed the Partial Test Ban Treaty the prior year; the treaty greatly reduced political support for the project. NASA had also decided, in 1959, that the civilian space program would be non-nuclear in the near-term.

The Orion concept offered both high thrust and high specific impulse, or propellant efficiency: 2,000 pulse units (I_{sp}) under the original design and an I_{sp} of perhaps 4,000 to 6,000 seconds according to the Air Force plan, with a later 1968 fusion bomb proposal by Dyson potentially increasing this to more than 75,000 I_{sp}, enabling velocities of 10,000 km/s. A moderate-sized nuclear device was estimated, at the time, to produce about 5 or 10 billion horsepower.

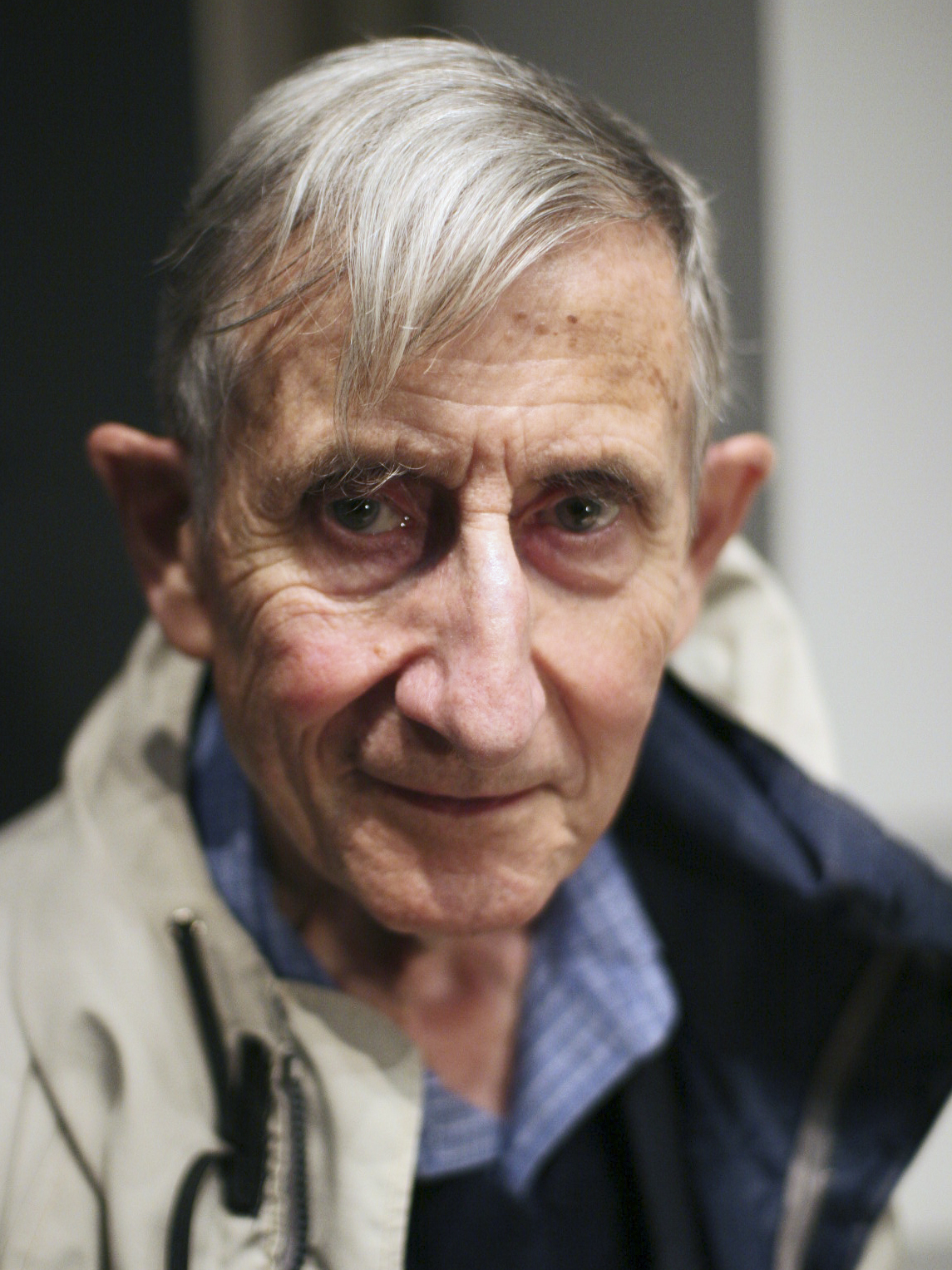
Freeman Dyson in 2005

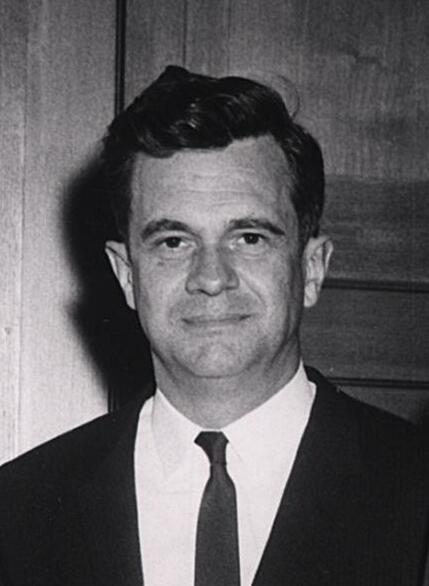
Ted Taylor in 1965

The extreme power of the nuclear explosions, relative to the vehicle's mass, would be managed by using external detonations, although an earlier version of the pulse concept did propose containing the blasts in an internal pressure structure, with one such design prepared by The Martin Company. As a qualitative power comparison, traditional chemical rockets, such as the Saturn V that took the Apollo program to the Moon, produce high thrust with low specific impulse, whereas electric ion engines produce a small amount of thrust very efficiently. Orion, by contrast, would have offered performance greater than the most advanced conventional or nuclear rocket engines then under consideration. Supporters of Project Orion felt that it had potential for cheap interplanetary travel.

From Project Longshot to Project Daedalus, Mini-Mag Orion, and other proposals which analyze thermal power dissipation, the principle of external nuclear pulse propulsion to maximize survivable power has remained common among serious concepts for interstellar flight without external power beaming and for very high-performance interplanetary flight. Such later proposals have tended to modify the basic principle by envisioning equipment driving detonation of much smaller fission or fusion pellets, in contrast to Project Orion's larger nuclear pulse units (full nuclear bombs).

== Basic principles ==
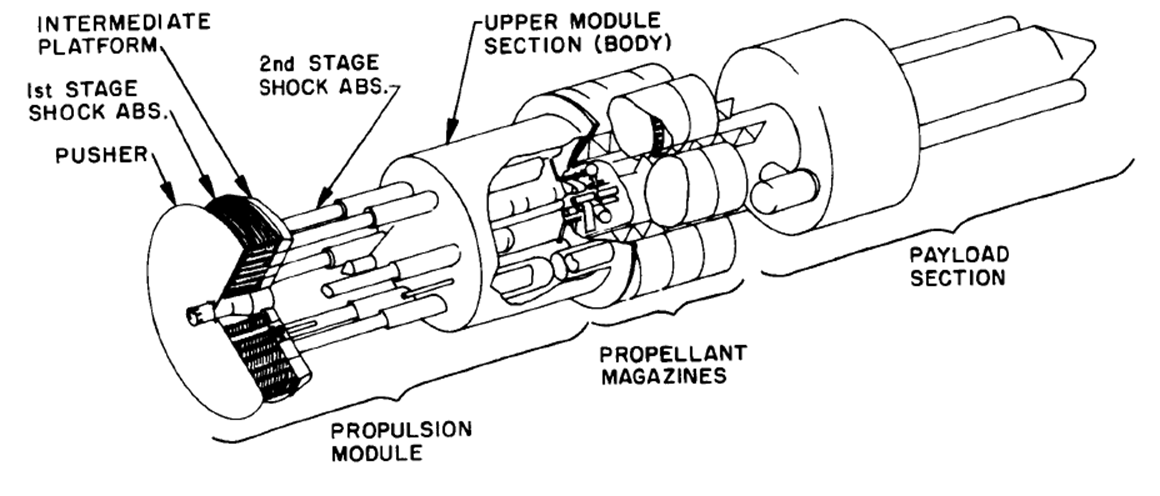
The Orion Spacecraft – key components

The Orion nuclear pulse drive combines a very high exhaust velocity, from 19 to 31 km/s (19 mi/s) in typical interplanetary designs, with meganewtons of thrust. Many spacecraft propulsion drives can achieve one of these or the other, but nuclear pulse rockets are the only proposed technology that could potentially meet the extreme power requirements to deliver both at once (see spacecraft propulsion for more speculative systems).

Specific impulse (I_{sp}) measures how much thrust can be derived from a given mass of fuel, and is a standard figure of merit for rocketry. For any rocket propulsion, since the kinetic energy of exhaust goes up with velocity squared (kinetic energy = 1/2mv^{2}), whereas the momentum and thrust go up with velocity linearly (momentum = mv), obtaining a particular level of thrust (as in a number of g acceleration) requires far more power each time that exhaust velocity and I_{sp} are much increased in a design goal. (For instance, the most fundamental reason that electric propulsion systems of high I_{sp} tend to be low thrust is due to their limits on available power. Their thrust is actually inversely proportional to I_{sp} if power going into exhaust is constant or at its limit from heat dissipation needs or other engineering constraints.) The Orion concept detonates nuclear explosions externally at a rate of power release which is beyond what nuclear reactors could survive internally with known materials and design.

Since weight is no limitation, an Orion craft can be extremely robust. An uncrewed craft could tolerate very large accelerations, perhaps 100 g. A human-crewed Orion, however, must use some sort of damping system behind the pusher plate to smooth the near instantaneous acceleration to a level that humans can comfortably withstand – typically about 2 to 4 g.

The high performance depends on the high exhaust velocity, in order to maximize the rocket's force for a given mass of propellant. The velocity of the plasma debris is proportional to the square root of the change in the temperature (T_{c}) of the nuclear fireball. Since such fireballs typically achieve ten million degrees Celsius or more in less than a millisecond, they create very high velocities. However, a practical design must also limit the destructive radius of the fireball. The diameter of the nuclear fireball is proportional to the square root of the bomb's explosive yield.

The shape of the bomb's reaction mass is critical to efficiency. The original project designed bombs with a reaction mass made of tungsten. The bomb's geometry and materials focused the X-rays and plasma from the core of nuclear explosive to hit the reaction mass. In effect each bomb would be a nuclear shaped charge.

A bomb with a cylinder of reaction mass expands into a flat, disk-shaped wave of plasma when it explodes. A bomb with a disk-shaped reaction mass expands into a far more efficient cigar-shaped wave of plasma debris. The cigar shape focuses much of the plasma to impinge onto the pusher-plate. For greatest mission efficiency the rocket equation demands that the greatest fraction of the bomb's explosive force be directed at the spacecraft, rather than being spent isotropically.

The maximum effective specific impulse, I_{sp}, of an Orion nuclear pulse drive generally is equal to:

$$I_{sp} = \frac{C_0 \cdot V_e}{g_n}$$

where C_{0} is the collimation factor (what fraction of the explosion plasma debris will actually hit the impulse absorber plate when a pulse unit explodes), V_{e} is the nuclear pulse unit plasma debris velocity, and g_{n} is the standard acceleration of gravity (9.81 m/s^{2}; this factor is not necessary if I_{sp} is measured in N·s/kg or m/s). A collimation factor of nearly 0.5 can be achieved by matching the diameter of the pusher plate to the diameter of the nuclear fireball created by the explosion of a nuclear pulse unit.

The smaller the bomb, the smaller each impulse will be, so the higher the rate of impulses and more than will be needed to achieve orbit. Smaller impulses also mean less g shock on the pusher plate and less need for damping to smooth out the acceleration.

The optimal Orion drive bomblet yield (for the human crewed 4,000 ton reference design) was calculated to be in the region of 0.15 kt, with approx 800 bombs needed to orbit and a bomb rate of approx 1 per second.

== Size of vehicles ==
The following can be found in George Dyson's book. The figures for the comparison with Saturn V are taken from this section and converted from metric (kg) to US short tons (abbreviated "t" here).

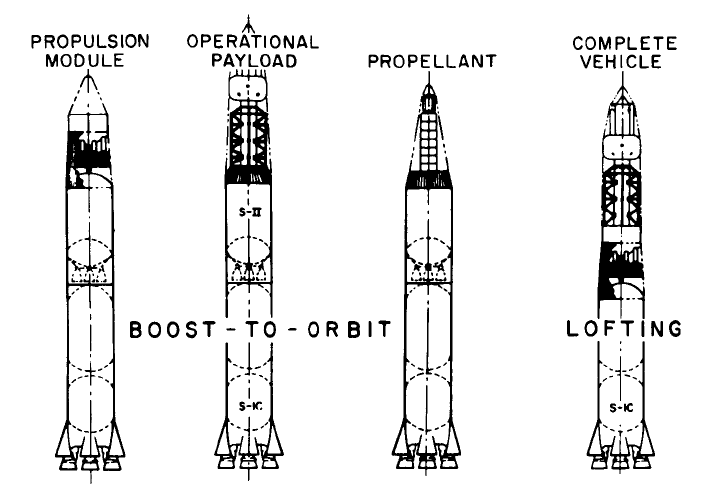
Image of the smallest Orion vehicle extensively studied, which could have had a payload of around 100 tons in an 8 crew round trip to Mars. On the left, the 10 meter diameter Saturn V "boost-to-orbit" variant, requiring in-orbit assembly before the Orion vehicle would be capable of moving under its own propulsion system. On the far right, the fully assembled "lofting" configuration, in which the spacecraft would be lifted high into the atmosphere before pulse propulsion began. As depicted in the 1964 NASA document "Nuclear Pulse Space Vehicle Study Vol III – Conceptual Vehicle Designs and Operational Systems".

	Orbital test	Interplanetary	Advanced interplanetary	Saturn V
Ship mass	880 t	4,000 t	10,000 t	3,350 t
Ship diameter	25 m	40 m	56 m	10 m
Ship height	36 m	60 m	85 m	110 m
Bomb yield (sea level)	0.03 kt	0.14 kt	0.35 kt	n/a
Bombs (to 300 mi low Earth orbit)	800	800	800	n/a
Payload (to 300 mi LEO)	300 t	1,600 t	6,100 t	130 t
Payload (to Moon soft landing)	170 t	1,200 t	5,700 t	2 t
Payload (Mars orbit return)	80 t	800 t	5,300 t	–
Payload (3 yr Saturn return)	–	–	1,300 t	–

In late 1958 to early 1959, it was realized that the smallest practical vehicle would be determined by the smallest achievable bomb yield. The use of 0.03 kt (sea-level yield) bombs would give vehicle mass of 880 tons. However, this was regarded as too small for anything other than an orbital test vehicle and the team soon focused on a 4,000 ton "base design".

At that time, the details of small bomb designs were shrouded in secrecy. Many Orion design reports had all details of bombs removed before release. Contrast the above details with the 1959 report by General Atomics, which explored the parameters of three different sizes of hypothetical Orion spacecraft:

	"Satellite" Orion	"Midrange" Orion	"Super" Orion
Ship diameter	17–20 m	40 m	400 m
Ship mass	300 t	1000–2000 t	8,000,000 t
Number of bombs	540	1080	1080
Individual bomb mass	0.22 t	0.37–0.75 t	3000 t

The biggest design above is the "super" Orion design; at 8 million tons, it could easily be a city. In interviews, the designers contemplated the large ship as a possible interstellar ark. This extreme design could be built with materials and techniques that could be obtained in 1958 or were anticipated to be available shortly after.

Most of the three thousand tons of each of the "super" Orion's propulsion units would be inert material such as polyethylene, or boron salts, used to transmit the force of the propulsion units detonation to the Orion's pusher plate, and absorb neutrons to minimize fallout. One design proposed by Freeman Dyson for the "Super Orion" called for the pusher plate to be composed primarily of uranium or a transuranic element so that upon reaching a nearby star system the plate could be converted to nuclear fuel.

== Theoretical applications ==
The Orion nuclear pulse rocket design has extremely high performance. Orion nuclear pulse rockets using nuclear fission type pulse units were originally intended for use on interplanetary space flights.

Missions that were designed for an Orion vehicle in the original project included single stage (i.e., directly from Earth's surface) to Mars and back, and a trip to one of the moons of Saturn.

Freeman Dyson performed the first analysis of what kinds of Orion missions were possible to reach Alpha Centauri, the nearest star system to the Sun. His 1968 paper "Interstellar Transport" (published in Physics Today) retained the concept of large nuclear explosions but Dyson moved away from the use of fission bombs and considered the use of one megaton deuterium fusion explosions instead. His conclusions were simple: the debris velocity of fusion explosions was probably in the 3000–30,000 km/s range and the reflecting geometry of Orion's hemispherical pusher plate would reduce that range to 750–15,000 km/s.

To estimate the upper and lower limits of what could be done using 1968 technology, Dyson considered two starship designs. The more conservative energy limited pusher plate design simply had to absorb all the thermal energy of each impinging explosion (4×10^{15} joules, half of which would be absorbed by the pusher plate) without melting. Dyson estimated that if the exposed surface consisted of copper with a thickness of 1 mm, then the diameter and mass of the hemispherical pusher plate would have to be 20 kilometers and 5 million tonnes, respectively. 100 seconds would be required to allow the copper to radiatively cool before the next explosion. It would then take on the order of 1000 years for the energy-limited heat sink Orion design to reach Alpha Centauri.

In order to improve on this performance while reducing size and cost, Dyson considered an alternative momentum limited pusher plate design where an ablation coating of the exposed surface is substituted to get rid of the excess heat. The limitation is then set by the capacity of shock absorbers to transfer momentum from the impulsively accelerated pusher plate to the smoothly accelerated vehicle. Dyson calculated that the properties of available materials limited the velocity transferred by each explosion to about 30 meters per second independent of the size and nature of the explosion. If the vehicle is to be accelerated at 1 Earth gravity (9.81 m/s^{2}) with this velocity transfer, then the pulse rate is one explosion every three seconds. The dimensions and performance of Dyson's vehicles are given as:

	"Energy limited" Orion	"Momentum limited" Orion
Ship diameter (meters)	20,000 m	100 m
Mass of empty ship (tons)	10,000,000 t (incl. 5,000,000 t copper hemisphere)	100,000 t (incl. 50,000 t structure + payload)
+Number of bombs = total bomb mass (each 1 Mt bomb weighs 1 ton)	30,000,000	300,000
=Departure mass (tons)	40,000,000 t	400,000 t
Maximum velocity (kilometers per second)	1000 km/s (=0.33% of the speed of light)	10,000 km/s (=3.3% of the speed of light)
Mean acceleration (Earth gravities)	0.00003 g (accelerate for 100 years)	1 g (accelerate for 10 days)
Time to Alpha Centauri (one way, no slow down)	1330 years	133 years
Estimated cost	1 year of U.S. GNP (1968), $3.67 trillion	0.1 year of U.S. GNP, $0.367 trillion

Later studies indicate that the top cruise velocity that can theoretically be achieved are a few percent of the speed of light (0.08–0.1 c). An atomic (fission) Orion can achieve perhaps 9–11% of the speed of light. A nuclear pulse drive starship powered by fusion-antimatter catalyzed nuclear pulse propulsion units would be similarly in the 10% range and pure matter-antimatter annihilation rockets would be theoretically capable of obtaining a velocity between 50% and 80% of the speed of light. In each case, saving fuel for slowing down halves the maximum speed. The concept of using a magnetic sail to decelerate the spacecraft as it approaches its destination has been discussed as an alternative to using propellant; this would allow the ship to travel near the maximum theoretical velocity.

At 0.1 c, Orion thermonuclear starships would require a flight time of at least 44 years to reach Alpha Centauri, not counting time needed to reach that speed (about 36 days at constant acceleration of 1 g or 9.8 m/s^{2}). At 0.1 c, an Orion starship would require 100 years to travel 10 light years. The astronomer Carl Sagan suggested that this would be an excellent use for stockpiles of nuclear weapons.

As part of the development of Project Orion, to garner funding from the military, a derived "space battleship" space-based nuclear-blast-hardened nuclear-missile weapons platform was mooted in the 1960s by the United States Air Force. It would comprise the USAF "Deep Space Bombardment Force".

== Later developments ==
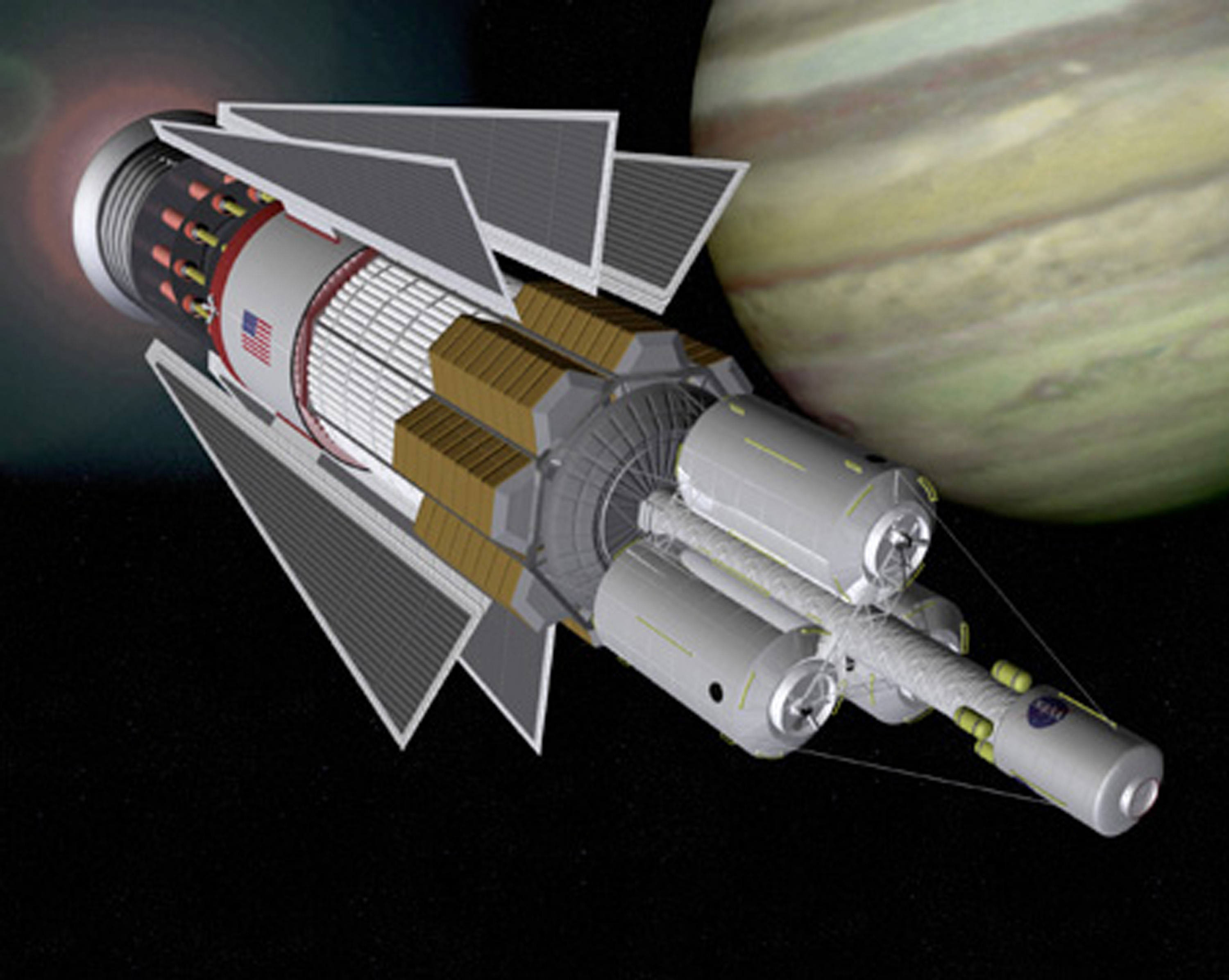
Modern pulsed fission propulsion concept

A concept similar to Orion was designed by the British Interplanetary Society (B.I.S.) in the years 1973–1974. Project Daedalus was to be a robotic interstellar probe to Barnard's Star that would travel at 12% of the speed of light. In 1989, a similar concept was studied by the U.S. Navy and NASA in Project Longshot. Both of these concepts require significant advances in fusion technology, and therefore cannot be built at present, unlike Orion.

From 1998 to the present, the nuclear engineering department at Pennsylvania State University has been developing two improved versions of project Orion known as Project ICAN and Project AIMStar using compact antimatter catalyzed nuclear pulse propulsion units, rather than the large inertial confinement fusion ignition systems proposed in Project Daedalus and Longshot.

== Costs ==
The expense of the fissionable materials required was thought to be high, until the physicist Ted Taylor showed that with the right designs for explosives, the amount of fissionables used on launch was close to constant for every size of Orion from 2,000 tons to 8,000,000 tons. The larger bombs used more explosives to super-compress the fissionables, increasing efficiency. The extra debris from the explosives also serves as additional propulsion mass.

The bulk of costs for historical nuclear defense programs have been for delivery and support systems, rather than for production cost of the bombs directly (with warheads being 7% of the U.S. 1946–1996 expense total according to one study). After initial infrastructure development and investment, the marginal cost of additional nuclear bombs in mass production can be relatively low. In the 1980s, some U.S. thermonuclear warheads had $1.1 million estimated cost each ($630 million for 560). For the perhaps simpler fission pulse units to be used by one Orion design, a 1964 source estimated a cost of $40,000 or less each in mass production (equivalent to $317,000 in 2025).

Project Daedalus later proposed fusion explosives (deuterium or tritium pellets) detonated by electron beam inertial confinement. This is the same principle behind inertial confinement fusion. Theoretically, it could be scaled down to far smaller explosions, and require small shock absorbers.

== Vehicle architecture ==
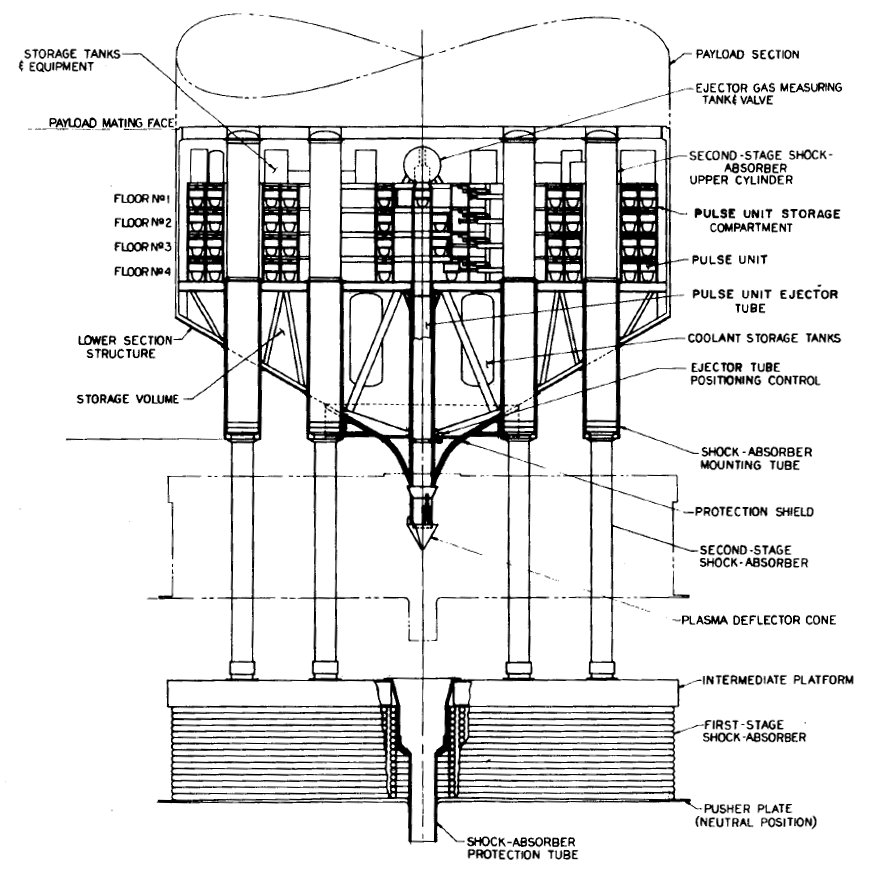
A design for the Orion propulsion module

From 1957 to 1964 this information was used to design a spacecraft propulsion system called Orion, in which nuclear explosives would be thrown behind a pusher-plate mounted on the bottom of a spacecraft and exploded. The shock wave and radiation from the detonation would impact against the underside of the pusher plate, giving it a powerful push. The pusher plate would be mounted on large two-stage shock absorbers that would smoothly transmit acceleration to the rest of the spacecraft.

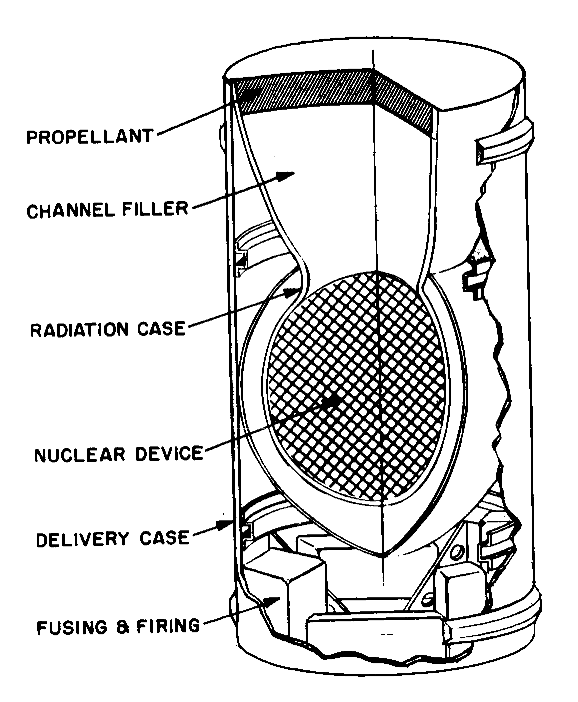
A design for a pulse unit

A preliminary design for a nuclear pulse unit was produced. It proposed the use of a shaped-charge fusion-boosted fission explosive. The explosive was wrapped in a beryllium oxide channel filler, which was surrounded by a uranium radiation mirror. The mirror and channel filler were open ended, and in this open end a flat plate of tungsten propellant was placed. The whole unit was built into a can with a diameter no larger than 6 inches (150 mm) and weighed just over 300 pounds (140 kg) so it could be handled by machinery scaled up from a soft-drink vending machine; Coca-Cola was consulted on the design.

At 1 microsecond after ignition the gamma bomb plasma and neutrons would heat the channel filler and be somewhat contained by the uranium shell. At 2–3 microseconds the channel filler would transmit some of the energy to the propellant, which vaporized. The flat plate of propellant formed a cigar-shaped explosion aimed at the pusher plate.

The plasma would cool to 14,000 °C (25,200 °F) as it traversed the 25 metres (82 ft) distance to the pusher plate and then reheat to 67,000 °C (120,600 °F) as, at about 300 microseconds, it hits the pusher plate and is recompressed. This temperature emits ultraviolet light, which is poorly transmitted through most plasmas. This helps keep the pusher plate cool. The cigar shaped distribution profile and low density of the plasma reduces the instantaneous shock to the pusher plate.

Because the momentum transferred by the plasma is greatest in the center, the pusher plate's thickness would decrease by approximately a factor of 6 from the center to the edge. This ensures the change in velocity is the same for the inner and outer parts of the plate.

At low altitudes where the surrounding air is dense, gamma scattering could potentially harm the crew without a radiation shield; a radiation refuge would also be necessary on long missions to survive solar flares. Radiation shielding effectiveness increases exponentially with shield thickness, see gamma ray for a discussion of shielding. On ships with a mass greater than 1,000 tonnes (2,200,000 lb) the structural bulk of the ship, its stores along with the mass of the bombs and propellant, would provide more than adequate shielding for the crew. Stability was initially thought to be a problem due to inaccuracies in the placement of the bombs, but it was later shown that the effects would cancel out.

Numerous model flight tests, using conventional explosives, were conducted at Point Loma, San Diego in 1959. On November 14, 1959, the one-meter model, also known as "Hot Rod" and "putt-putt", first flew using RDX (chemical explosives) in a controlled flight for 23 seconds to a height of 56 metres (184 ft). Film of the tests has been transcribed to video and was featured on the BBC TV program To Mars by A-Bomb in 2003 with comments by Freeman Dyson and Arthur C. Clarke. The model landed by parachute undamaged and is in the collection of the Smithsonian National Air and Space Museum.

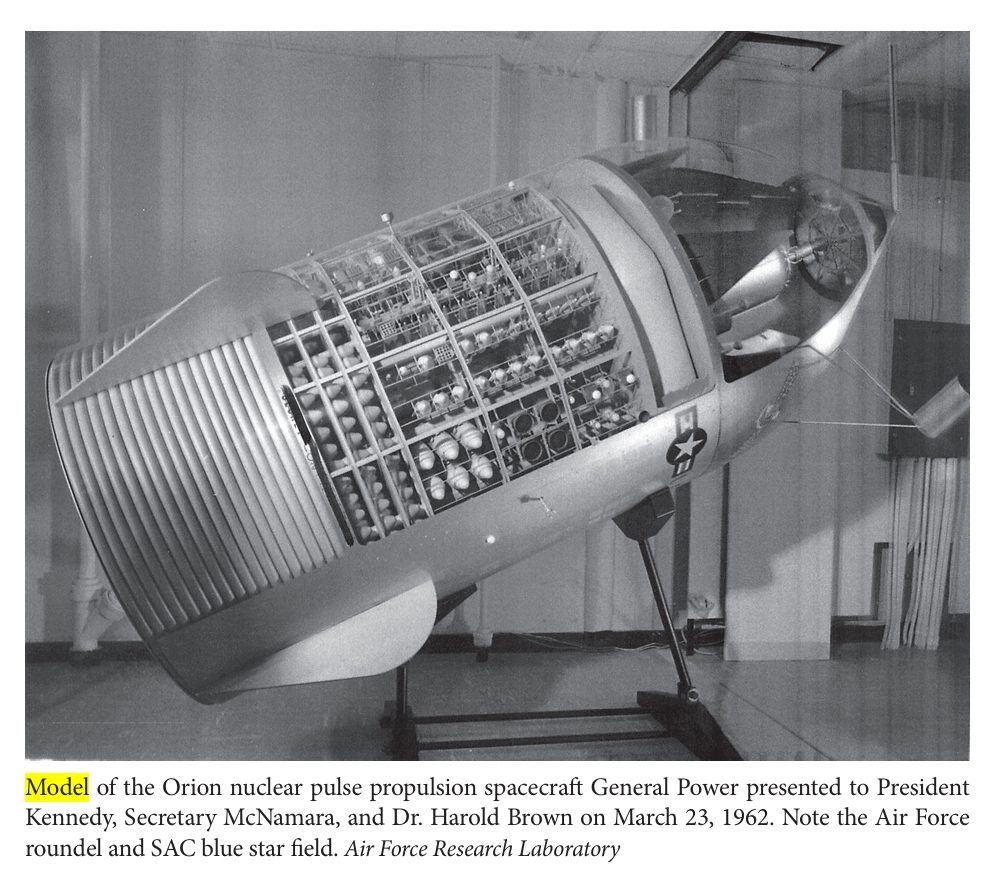
Model of Orion Spacecraft

The first proposed shock absorber was a ring-shaped airbag. It was soon realized that, should an explosion fail, the 500–1,000 tonnes (1,100,000–2,200,000 lb) pusher plate would tear away the airbag on the rebound. So a two-stage detuned spring and piston shock absorber design was developed. On the reference design the first stage mechanical absorber was tuned to 4.5 times the pulse frequency whilst the second stage gas piston was tuned to 0.5 times the pulse frequency. This permitted timing tolerances of 10 ms in each explosion.

The final design coped with bomb failure by overshooting and rebounding into a center position. Thus following a failure and on initial ground launch it would be necessary to start or restart the sequence with a lower yield device. In the 1950s, methods of adjusting bomb yield were in their infancy and considerable thought was given to providing a means of swapping out a standard yield bomb for a smaller yield one in a 2 or 3 second time frame or to provide an alternative means of firing low yield bombs. Modern variable yield devices would allow a single standardized explosive to be tuned down (configured to a lower yield) automatically.

The bombs had to be launched behind the pusher plate with enough velocity to explode 20–30 metres (66–98 ft) beyond it every 1.1 seconds. Numerous proposals were investigated, from multiple guns poking over the edge of the pusher plate to rocket propelled bombs launched from roller coaster tracks; however, the final reference design used a simple gas gun to shoot the devices through a hole in the center of the pusher plate.

== Potential problems ==
=== Ablation (erosion) ===
Exposure to repeated nuclear blasts raises the problem of ablation of the pusher plate. Calculations and experiments indicated that a steel pusher plate would ablate less than 1mm, if unprotected. If sprayed with an oil, it would not ablate at all. The absorption spectra of carbon and hydrogen minimize heating. The design temperature of the shockwave, 67,000 °C (120,600 °F), emits ultraviolet light. Most materials and elements are opaque to ultraviolet, especially at the 340 MPa (49,000 psi) pressures the plate experiences. This prevents the plate from melting or ablating.

When the project ended, it was still unclear if the turbulence from the propellant and also the ablated pusher plate would significantly boost the total ablation. In the 1960s, Freeman Dyson noted that, resolving this would have required an actual nuclear test. Without the use of physical experimentation, a conclusion could not be found. However, modern simulations can now provide an accurate answer.

=== Spalling ===
Another potential problem with the pusher plate was that of spalling: the shockwave from the impact of the plasma on the bottom of the plate would pass through the plate and reach its top surface, potentially causing it to spall and become damaged over time.

One idea was to absorb the shocks with water-cooled springs behind the plate. However the ultimate solution was to add magnetic shielding: magnetic field lines would be generated parallel to the surface of the pusher pate, and the expanding plasma from the explosion would push the field lines against the conductor, increasing the flux density. The increased magnetic pressure would slow down the plasma, thus reversing its direction and accelerating it away from the pusher plate.

If the conventional explosives in the nuclear bomb detonated but a nuclear explosion did not ignite, shrapnel could have damaged the pusher plate.

Physical tests of the vehicle systems were thought to be impossible because several thousand nuclear explosions could not be performed in any one place. So instead, experiments were designed to test the pusher plates in nuclear fireballs, and the long-term tests of pusher plates could occur in space. The shock-absorber designs could be tested at full-scale on Earth using chemical explosives.

=== Ground-Based Takeoff ===
Multiple risks from mechanical and blast related hazards also posed a threat. Studies of ground hazards noted that accidental detonation of the high explosives within pulse units (without nuclear yield) could still produce a lot of shrapnel effects over thousands of meters. Another ground-based issue was the shockwaves that would be produced from the interaction of the nuclear blasts and the ground during take-off. Proposed mitigations included lifting the spacecraft off the ground using conventional explosives before initiating nuclear pulses. This would have lifted the ship far enough into the air that the first focused nuclear blast would not create debris that would be capable of harming the ship. Another proposed solution was that it could be boosted into orbit using the Saturn V upper stage.

=== Nuclear Fallout ===
However, the main unsolved problem for a launch from the surface of the Earth was thought to be nuclear fallout. Freeman Dyson, estimated back in the 1960s that with conventional nuclear weapons, each launch would statistically cause on average between 0.1 and 1 fatal cancers from the fallout. That estimate is based on no-threshold model assumptions, a method often used in estimates of statistical deaths from other industrial activities. Each few million dollars of efficiency indirectly gained or lost in the world economy may statistically average lives saved or lost, in terms of opportunity gains versus costs. Indirect effects could matter for whether the overall influence of an Orion-based space program on future human global mortality would be a net increase or a net decrease, including if change in launch costs and capabilities affected space exploration, space colonization, the odds of long-term human species survival, space-based solar power, or other hypotheticals.

From many smaller detonations combined, the fallout for the entire launch of a 6,000 short tons (5,400 t) Orion is equal to the detonation of a typical 10 megaton (40 petajoule) nuclear weapon as an air burst, therefore most of its fallout would be the comparatively dilute delayed fallout. Assuming the use of nuclear explosives with a high portion of total yield from fission, it would produce a combined fallout total similar to the surface burst yield of the Mike shot of Operation Ivy, a 10.4 megaton device detonated in 1952. The comparison is not quite perfect as, due to its surface burst location, Ivy Mike created a large amount of early fallout contamination. Historical above-ground nuclear weapon tests included 189 megatons of fission yield and caused average global radiation exposure per person peaking at 0.11 mSv/a (1.0×10^{−5} rem/sq ft) in 1963, with a 0.007 mSv/a (6.5×10^{−7} rem/sq ft) residual in modern times, superimposed upon other sources of exposure, primarily natural background radiation, which averages 2.4 mSv/a (0.00022 rem/sq ft) globally but varies greatly, such as 6 mSv/a (0.00056 rem/sq ft) in some high-altitude cities. Any comparison would be influenced by how population dosage is affected by detonation locations, with very remote sites preferred.

With special designs of the nuclear explosive, Ted Taylor estimated that fission product fallout could be reduced tenfold, or maybe even to zero, if a pure fusion explosive could be constructed instead. A 100% pure fusion explosive has yet to be successfully developed, according to declassified US government documents, although relatively clean PNEs (peaceful nuclear explosions) were tested for canal excavation by the Soviet Union in the 1970s with 98% fusion yield in the Taiga test's 15 kiloton devices, 0.3 kilotons fission, which excavated part of the proposed Pechora–Kama Canal.

=== Political issues ===
The vehicle's propulsion system and its test program would violate the Partial Test Ban Treaty of 1963, as currently written, which prohibits all nuclear detonations except those conducted underground as an attempt to slow the arms race and to limit the amount of radiation in the atmosphere caused by nuclear detonations. There was an effort by the US government to put an exception into the 1963 treaty to allow for the use of nuclear propulsion for spaceflight, but Soviet fears about military applications kept the exception out of the treaty. This limitation would affect only the US, Russia, and the United Kingdom. It would also violate the Comprehensive Nuclear-Test-Ban Treaty which has been signed by the United States and China but not ratified.

=== Electromagnetic pulses ===
The launch of such an Orion nuclear bomb rocket from the ground or low Earth orbit would generate an electromagnetic pulse that could cause significant damage to computers and satellites, as well as flooding the van Allen belts with high-energy radiation. Since the EMP footprint would be a few hundred miles wide, this problem might be solved by launching from very remote areas. A few relatively small space-based electrodynamic tethers could be deployed to quickly eject the energetic particles from the capture angles of the van Allen belts.

== Termination ==
The projects eventual cancellation was because of the lack of a mission requirement, the decision to focus on sending rockets to the moon, and ultimately the signing of the Partial Test Ban Treaty in 1963, which prevented testing nuclear weapons in the atmosphere and space.

== Notable personnel ==
- Lew Allen, contract manager
- Jerry Astl, explosives engineer
- Jeremy Bernstein, physicist
- Edward Creutz, physicist
- Brian Dunne, Orion's chief scientist
- Freeman Dyson, physicist
- Harold Finger, physicist
- Burt Freeman, physicist
- Edward B. Giller, USAF liaison
- Charles Clark Loomis, physicist
- Harris Mayer, physicist
- James Nance, project director
- H. Pierre Noyes, physicist
- Ronald F. Prater, USAF liaison
- Don Prickett, USAF liaison
- Kedar "Bud" Pyatt, mathematician
- Morris Scharff, physicist
- Ted Taylor, project director
- Micheal Treshow, physicist
- Stanisław Ulam, mathematician

== Operation Plumbbob ==
A test that was similar to the test of a pusher plate occurred as an accidental side effect of a nuclear containment test called "Pascal-B" conducted on 27 August 1957. The test's experimental designer Dr. Robert Brownlee performed a highly approximate calculation that suggested that the low-yield nuclear explosive would accelerate the massive (900 kg) steel capping plate to six times escape velocity. The plate was never found but Dr. Brownlee believes that the plate never left the atmosphere; for example, it could have been vaporized by compression heating of the atmosphere due to its high speed. The calculated velocity was interesting enough that the crew trained a high-speed camera on the plate which, unfortunately, only appeared in one frame, indicating a very high lower bound for the speed of the plate.

== Notable appearances in fiction ==
The first appearance of the idea in print appears to be Robert A. Heinlein's 1940 short story, "Blowups Happen".

As discussed by Arthur C. Clarke in his recollections of the making of the film 2001: A Space Odyssey in The Lost Worlds of 2001, a nuclear-pulse version of the U.S. interplanetary spacecraft Discovery One was considered. However the Discovery in the movie did not use this idea, as Stanley Kubrick thought it might be considered parody after making Dr. Strangelove or: How I Learned to Stop Worrying and Love the Bomb.

An Orion spaceship features prominently in the 1985 science fiction novel Footfall by Larry Niven and Jerry Pournelle. In the face of an alien siege/invasion of Earth, the humans must resort to drastic measures to get a fighting ship into orbit to face the alien fleet.

The 1998 film Deep Impact featured a spacecraft named Messiah, which utilized the "Orion drive" and appears to be a variant of nuclear detonation propulsion. In the film, the drive is credited to the Russians.

The opening premise of the 2014 miniseries Ascension is that in 1963 President John F. Kennedy and the U.S. government, fearing the Cold War will escalate and lead to the destruction of Earth, launched the Ascension, an Orion-class spaceship, to colonize a planet orbiting Proxima Centauri, assuring the survival of the human race.

Author Stephen Baxter's 2008 science fiction novel Ark employs an Orion-class generation ship to escape ecological disaster on Earth.

Towards the conclusion of his Empire Games trilogy, Charles Stross includes a spacecraft modeled after Project Orion. The crafts' designers, constrained by a 1960s level of industrial capacity, intend it to be used to explore parallel worlds and to act as a nuclear deterrent, leapfrogging their foes' more contemporary capabilities.

In the horror novel Torment by Jeremy Robinson (written under the pseudonym Jeremy Bishop), the main characters escape from a global nuclear war in a nuclear pulse propulsion craft. The craft is among 3 others; part of the "Orion Protocol", an escape mechanism for members of the federal government. The craft are housed in a subterranean chamber below The Ellipse in Washington, D.C.

In the 2008 science fiction novel The Three-Body Problem and its associated television show, a probe is launched towards an approaching alien fleet using a variation of the Orion method.

In the 2026 video game Terra Invicta, nuclear pulse propulsion — starting with an Orion-based engine — is a usable technology for interstellar spacecraft.

== Project Super Orion ==
=== Story ===
Project Super Orion was a significantly larger model of Project Orion. While Orion's base scale weighed 300-10,000 tons, Super Orion blew this away with an astonishing 8 million tons. But like Orion this was only proposed and never left the drawing board.

== See also ==
- AIMStar
- Antimatter-catalyzed nuclear pulse propulsion
- Helios (propulsion system)
- NERVA (Nuclear Engine for Rocket Vehicle Application)
- Nuclear propulsion
- Nuclear salt-water rocket
- Peaceful nuclear explosion
- Project Pluto
- Project Prometheus
- Project Valkyrie
