= Ted Taylor (physicist) =

American theoretical nuclear physicist (1925–2004)

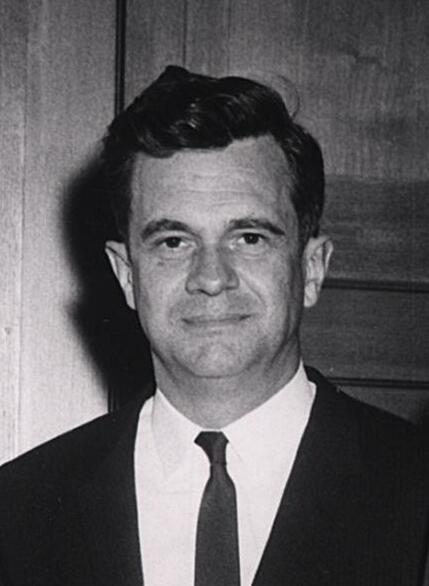
- Taylor in 1965
- Born: Theodore Brewster Taylor; July 11, 1925; Mexico City, Mexico
- Died: October 28, 2004 (aged 79); Silver Spring, Maryland, U.S.
- Citizenship: Mexico, United States
- Education: California Institute of Technology, University of California, Berkeley, and Cornell University
- Known for: Nuclear weapon designs and nuclear disarmament advocacy
- Awards: E. O. Lawrence Award (1965)
- Scientific career
- Fields: Theoretical physics
- Workplaces: Los Alamos National Laboratory, General Atomics, Defense Atomic Support Agency

Theodore Brewster Taylor (July 11, 1925 – October 28, 2004) was an American theoretical physicist, specifically concerning nuclear energy. His higher education included a PhD from Cornell University in theoretical physics. His most noteworthy contributions to the field of nuclear weaponry were his small bomb developments at the Los Alamos Laboratory in New Mexico. Although not widely known to the general public, Taylor is credited with numerous landmarks in fission nuclear weaponry development, including having designed and developed the smallest, most powerful, and most efficient fission weapons ever tested by the U.S. program. His vision and creativity allowed him to thrive in the field. The later part of Taylor's career was focused on nuclear energy instead of weaponry, and included his work on Project Orion, nuclear reactor developments, and anti-nuclear proliferation.

== Early life ==
Ted Taylor was born in Mexico City, Mexico, on July 11, 1925. His mother and father were both Americans. His mother, Barbara Southworth Howland Taylor, held a PhD in Mexican literature from the Universidad Nacional Autónoma de México, and his father, Walter Clyde Taylor, was the director of a YMCA in Mexico City. Before marrying in 1922, his father had been a widower with three sons and his mother a widow with a son of her own. Taylor's four half-brothers were old enough that Ted was essentially raised as an only child. Both of his maternal grandparents were Congregationalist missionaries in Guadalajara. Taylor grew up in a house without electricity in the Atlixo 13 neighborhood of Cuernavaca. His upbringing was quiet and religious, and his home was filled with books, mainly atlases and geographies, which he would read by candlelight. This interest followed him into adulthood.

Taylor showed an early interest in chemistry, specifically pyrotechnics, when he received a chemistry set at the age of ten. This fascination was enhanced when a small and exclusive university in the area built a chemistry laboratory in his neighborhood, after which Taylor had access to items from local druggists that otherwise would not have been readily available, including corrosive and explosive chemicals, as well as nitric and sulfuric acids. These allowed him to conduct his own experiments. He also often read through the 1913 New International Encyclopedia, which contained extensive chemistry, for new concoctions to make. These included sleeping drugs, small explosives, guncotton, precipitates, and many more. His mother was extremely tolerant of his experimentation but prohibited any experiments that involved nitroglycerin.

Growing up, Taylor also showed an interest in billiards. In the afternoons after school, he played billiards for almost ten hours a week. He would recall this early interest as his introduction to the mechanics of collisions, relating it to his later work in particle physics. The behavior of the interacting balls on the table and their elastic collisions within the confining framework of the reflector cushions helped him to conceptualize the difficult abstractions of cross sections, neutron scattering, and fission chain reactions.

As a child, he developed a passion for music and would quietly sit for an hour and listen to his favorite songs in the mornings before school. Later, while completing his PhD at Cornell, he noted that while his theoretical physicist peers embraced the classical music piped into their rooms, their experimentalist counterparts would uniformly shut the system off.

Taylor attended the American School in Mexico City from elementary school through high school. A gifted student, he finished the fourth through sixth grades in one year. Being an accelerated student, Taylor found himself three years younger than his friends as he entered his teens. Taylor graduated early from high school in 1941 at the age of 15. Not yet meeting the age requirements for American universities, he then attended the Exeter Academy in New Hampshire for one year, where he took Modern Physics from Elbert P. Little. This developed his interest in physics, though he displayed poor academic performance in the course: Little gave Taylor a grade D on his final winter term examination. He quickly brushed this failure off and soon confirmed that he wanted to be a physicist. Apart from education, he also developed an interest in throwing discus at Exeter. This interest continued into his college career, as he continued to throw discus at Caltech.

He enrolled at the California Institute of Technology in 1942 and then spent his second and third years in the Navy V-12 program. This accelerated his schooling, and he graduated with a bachelor's degree in physics from Caltech in 1945 at age nineteen.

After graduation, he attended the midshipman school at Throgs Neck, in the Bronx, New York, for one year to fulfill his naval active duty requirement. He was discharged in mid-1946, by which time he had been promoted to the rank of lieutenant.

He then enrolled in a graduate program in theoretical physics at the University of California at Berkeley, while also working part-time at the Berkeley Radiation laboratory, mainly on the cyclotron and a beta-ray spectrograph. After failing an oral preliminary examination on mechanics and heat, and a second prelim in modern physics in 1949, Taylor was disqualified from the graduate program.

== Early career ==
Prior to Taylor's work at Los Alamos, he had firmly declared himself an opponent of nuclear weapons. While at the midshipmen school, he received news of the atomic bombing of Hiroshima by the United States. He immediately wrote a letter home discussing the perils of nuclear proliferation and his fears that it would lead to the end of mankind in the event of another war. He showed some optimism, however, as he felt with proper leadership the nuclear bomb could result in the end of wars altogether. Either way, he was still very curious about the field of nuclear physics after his time as an undergraduate.

Taylor began his work in nuclear physics in 1949 when he was hired to a junior position at Los Alamos National Laboratory in the Theoretical Physics Division. He received this job after failing out of the PhD program at Berkeley; J. Carson Mark connected Taylor with a leader at Los Alamos and recommended him for a position. Taylor was unsure of the details of his new job at Los Alamos prior to his arrival. He had only been briefed that his first assignment related to investigations of Neutron Diffusion Theory, a theoretical analysis of neutron movement within a nuclear core. While at Los Alamos, Taylor's strictly anti-nuclear development beliefs changed. His theory on preventing nuclear war turned to developing bombs of unprecedented power in an attempt to make people, including governments, so afraid of the consequences of nuclear warfare that they would not dare engage in this sort of altercation. He continued in his junior position at Los Alamos until 1953, when he took a temporary leave of absence to obtain his PhD from Cornell.

Finishing his PhD in 1954, he returned to Los Alamos, and by 1956, he was famous for his work in small-bomb development. Freeman Dyson is quoted as saying, "A great part of the small-bomb development of the last five years [at Los Alamos] was directly due to Ted." Although the majority of the brilliant minds at Los Alamos were focused on developing the fusion bomb, Taylor remained hard at work on improving fission bombs. His innovations in this area of study were so important that he was eventually given the freedom to choose whatever he wanted to study. Eventually, Taylor's stance on nuclear warfare and weapon development changed, altering his career path. In 1956, Taylor left his position at Los Alamos and went to work for General Atomics. Here, he developed TRIGA, a reactor that produced isotopes used in the medical field. In 1958, Taylor began working on Project Orion, which sought to develop space travel that relied on nuclear energy as the fuel source. The proposed spacecraft would use a series of nuclear fission reactions as its propellant, thus accelerating space travel while eliminating the Earth's source of fuel for nuclear weaponry. In collaboration with Dyson, Taylor led the project development team for six years until the 1963 Nuclear Test Ban Treaty was instituted. After this, they could not test their developments, and the project became unviable.

== Late career ==
Taylor's career shifted again after Project Orion. He developed an even greater fear of the potential ramifications of his entire life's work and began taking precautionary measures to mitigate those concerns. In 1964, he served as the deputy director of the Defense Atomic Support Agency (a branch within the Department of Defense), where he managed the U.S. nuclear weapons inventory. Then, in 1966 he created a consulting firm called the International Research and Technology Corporation, located in Vienna, Austria, which sought to prevent the development of more nuclear weapons programs. Taylor also worked as a visiting professor at the University of California, Santa Cruz and Princeton University. His focus eventually turned to renewable energy, and In 1980 Taylor started a company called Nova Incorporated, which focused on nuclear energy alternatives as a means of supplementing the energy requirements of the earth. He studied energy capture from sources like cooling ice ponds and heating solar ponds, and eventually turned to energy conservation within buildings. Concerning this work in energy conservation, he founded a not-for-profit organization in Montgomery County, Maryland called Damascus Energy, which focuses on energy efficiency within the home. Taylor also served as the President of the United States' commission concerning the Three Mile Island Accident, working to mitigate issues associated with the reactor meltdown.

== Private life ==
Taylor married Caro Arnim in 1948 and had five children in the following years: Clare Hastings, Katherine Robertson, Christopher Taylor, Robert Taylor, and Jeffrey Taylor. Arnim was majoring in Greek at Scripps College, a liberal arts university in Claremont, California, and Taylor would visit her whenever he could. Both Arnim and Taylor were very shy people, and unsure of what the future held. When they first met, they both believed that Taylor would end up as a college professor in a sleepy town, and that Caro would be a librarian. After 44 years of marriage the couple divorced in 1992.

Taylor died on October 28, 2004, of coronary artery disease, at the age of 79.

== Legacy ==
Taylor was involved in many important projects and made numerous contributions to nuclear development for the United States. During his time at Los Alamos, he was responsible for designing the smallest fission bomb of the era, the 'Davy Crockett', which weighed only 23 kilograms (50 lb), measured approximately 300-millimetre (12 in) across, and could produce between 10 and 20 tons of TNT equivalent. This device was formerly known as the M28 Weapons System. The Davy Crockett itself was the M388 Atomic Round fired from the weapons system, featuring a recoilless rifle either erected and fixed on as freestanding tripod or mounted on the frame of a light utility vehicle, such as the Jeep, the former functioned similarly to other modern rocket propelled rounds (see RPG-7). It was a mounted weapons system, which means that it would be set up, aimed, and fired as a crew-served weapon. Taylor also designed fission bombs smaller than the Davy Crockett, which were developed after he left Los Alamos. He designed a nuclear bomb so small that it weighed only 9.1 kilograms (20 lb), but it was never developed and tested. Taylor designed the Super Oralloy Bomb, also known as the "SOB". It still holds the record for the largest fission explosion ever tested (as the Ivy King device tested during Operation Ivy), producing over 500 kilotons of TNT equivalent. Taylor was credited with developing multiple techniques that improved the fission bomb. For example, he was largely responsible for the development of fusion boosting, which is a technique that improves the reaction yield and efficiency of a nuclear reaction. This technique was a re-invention of the implosion mechanism used in the bomb detonated at Nagasaki. He theorized a series of nuclear reactions within the implosion mechanism that, in combination, trigger the large chain reaction to detonate. This eliminated much of the energy waste and necessity for precision of the original reaction mechanism. This technique is still found in all U.S. fission nuclear weapons today. He also developed a technique that greatly reduced the size of atomic bombs. First tested in a bomb called "Scorpion", it used a reflector made of beryllium, which was drastically lighter than the materials previously used, such as tungsten carbide (WC). Taylor recognized that although a low-atomic-number element like beryllium did not "bounce" neutrons back into the fissile core as efficiently as heavy tungsten, its propensity for neutron spallation (in nuclear physics the so-called "(n,2n)" reaction) more than compensated in overall reflector performance.

After these breakthroughs, Taylor became a more important figure at Los Alamos. He was included in high-priority situations reserved for important personnel, and was even taken to The Pentagon as a consultant on strategies and the potential outcomes of a nuclear war with Russia. In total, Taylor was responsible for the development of eight bombs: the Super Oralloy Bomb, Davy Crockett, Scorpion, Hamlet, Bee, Hornet, Viper, and the Puny Plutonium bomb. The latter was the first-ever nuclear fizzle (dud) in the history of U.S. nuclear tests. He produced the bomb called Hamlet after receiving direct orders from military officials to pursue a project in bomb efficiency; it ended up being the most efficient fission bomb ever exploded in the kiloton range.

Apart from bombs, Taylor also explored concepts of producing large amounts of nuclear fuel in an expedited manner. His plans, known as MICE (Megaton Ice Contained Explosions), essentially sought to plant a thermonuclear weapon deep in the ice and detonate it, resulting in a giant underground pool of radioactive materials that could then be retrieved. While his idea had merit, Taylor ultimately received little support for this concept and the project never came to fruition.

== Publications and other works ==
Ted Taylor was an author in the latter part of his career. He worked in cooperation with many specialists in other fields to publish his work on anti-nuclear proliferation and sustainable nuclear energy. Perhaps the greatest fear that propelled Taylor to work so fervently in these areas was the realization that the consequences of nuclear material ending up in the wrong hands could be severe.

Nuclear Theft: Risks and Safeguards is a book Taylor wrote in collaboration with Mason Willrich in the 1970s. According to reviews, the book predicted a future where nuclear energy was the primary energy source in the United States, and therefore needed enhanced protective measures to protect the public. In the book, Taylor and Willrich provide multiple recommendations on ways to prevent nuclear material from ending up in the wrong hands, as they anticipated that there would be multiple more sources of nuclear byproducts and therefore more opportunity for nuclear theft. This book likely was a culmination of much of Ted's work in the field, as he often toured nuclear reactor sites and provided insight on potential weak points in their security measures.

Taylor also co-authored the book The Restoration of the Earth with Charles C. Humpstone. According to reviews, the book focused on techniques to enhance sustainability and expanded on different sources of energy that could be used alternatively to meet the power needs of the earth. This book was also a culmination of his focus on nuclear security and the ramifications of the use of nuclear weaponry. In it he addressed the potential effects of nuclear fallout on the environment. This 1973 hardcover discussed potential sources of energy in 2000, along with the conceptualization of safer alternatives to the methods of acquiring nuclear energy that were available at the time. In fact, Taylor indirectly referenced a concept for a nuclear reactor that is inherently similar to a reactor that he patented in 1964. Taylor spent much of his time studying the risk potential of the nuclear power fuel cycle after learning about the detrimental effects that his nuclear weapons had on the environment, so he sought to explore new opportunities for safer use of nuclear power. In his writing, Taylor argued that the most dangerous and devastating events that could possibly occur during nuclear research would most likely happen at reactors that are incapable of running efficiently and maintaining a safe temperature. Taylor went on to state that the prioritization of safety in nuclear reactors is relatively low compared to how it should be, and that if one were to create a nuclear reactor with the capability of cooling down—without the initiation of a fission reaction—then efforts at harvesting nuclear energy would be more incentivized and exponentially safer.

Taylor also wrote the book Nuclear Proliferation: Motivations, Capabilities and Strategies for Control with Harold Feiveson and Ted Greenwood. The book explains the two most dangerous mechanisms by which nuclear proliferation could be devastating for the world, as well as how to disincentivize nuclear proliferation within destabilizing political systems.

Taylor further collaborated with George Gamow on a study called "What the World Needs Is a Good Two-Kiloton Bomb", which investigated the concept of small nuclear artillery weapons. This paper reflected another shift in Taylor's beliefs about nuclear weapons. He had changed from his deterrent position to a position that sought to develop small-yield nuclear weapons that could target specific areas and minimize collateral damage.

Taylor was not only involved in the publication of the aforementioned books, but he, along with a few of his colleagues, was also responsible for a number of patents involving nuclear physics. Taylor is credited with patenting a nuclear reactor with a prompt negative temperature coefficient and fuel element, along with a patent protecting their discovery of an efficient method of producing isotopes from thermonuclear explosions. The patent concerning the production of isotopes from thermonuclear explosions was groundbreaking because of its efficiency and cost effectiveness. It also provides a means for attaining necessary elements that otherwise are difficult to find in nature. Prior to this discovery, the cost per neutron in a nuclear reaction was relatively high. The patent concerning the prompt negative temperature coefficient was groundbreaking because it provided a markedly safer reactor even in the event of misuse. With the negative temperature coefficient, the reactor can mitigate sudden surges of reactivity propelled into the system. These patented realizations would later become vital components in the future of nuclear technology.

The Curve of Binding Energy, by John McPhee, is written primarily about the life of Theodore Taylor, as he and McPhee traveled together quite often—spending a great deal of time with one another. It is evident that during their time together, McPhee was very inclined to learn from Taylor. Many of Taylor's personal opinions regarding nuclear energy and safety are mentioned throughout McPhee's writing. McPhee voices one of Taylor's bigger concerns in particular—that plutonium can be devastating if left in the wrong hands. According to McPhee, Taylor suspected that if plutonium were to be acquired by someone with ill intentions and handled improperly, the aftermath could be catastrophic, as plutonium is a rather volatile element and can be lethal for anyone within hundreds of miles. This clearly can be avoided, Taylor suggests, if nuclear reactors are protected and all sources of nuclear fuel elements are heavily guarded. The book would inspire Princeton student John Aristotle Phillips, and several other imitators, to prove Taylor's contention that "anyone" could design a plausible nuclear weapon using declassified and public information.

== The Santa Claus machine and Pugwash ==
According to Freitas and Merkle, the only known extant source on Taylor's concept of the "Santa Claus machine" is found in Nigel Calder's Spaceships of the Mind. The concept would use a large mass spectrometer to separate an ion beam into atomic elements for later use in making products.

Taylor was a member of the Pugwash Conferences on Science and World Affairs and attended several of its meetings during the 1980s. After his retirement, he lived in Wellsville, New York.

== Freeman Dyson on Taylor ==
Freeman Dyson said of Taylor, "Very few people have Ted's imagination. ... I think he is perhaps the greatest man that I ever knew well. And he is completely unknown."

== Media appearances ==
- The Voyage of the Mimi: Water, Water, Everywhere (PBS, 1984)
- History Undercover: Code Name Project Orion (1999)
- To Mars by A-Bomb: The Secret History of Project Orion (BBC, 2003)

== See also ==
- Alvin C. Graves
- Amory Lovins
- List of books about nuclear issues
- List of nuclear whistleblowers
- National Security Archive
- Nevada Test Site
- Nuclear disarmament
- Nuclear weapons of the United States
