= Morris Scharff =

American physicist

- Born: January 11, 1929; America
- Died: November 22, 2017 (aged 88); La Jolla, United States
- Occupation: Physicist

Morris "Moe" Scharff was an American physicist and explosive engineer who researched the ablation aspects of the American Project Orion nuclear propulsion spacecraft in the 1950s and 1960s.

Moe died on November 22, 2017.
