= Linden Blue =

American aviation executive

- Born: Linden Stanley Blue; 1936 (age 89–90); Meeker, Colorado, US
- Occupation: Businessman
- Known for: Co-owner and vice-chairman, General Atomics
- Parents: James Elliot Blue (died 1986) (father); Virginia Neal Blue (died 1970) (mother)
- Relatives: Neal Blue (brother)

Linden Stanley Blue (born 1936) is an American aviation executive. He is the co-owner and vice chairman of General Atomics, the U.S. military contractor that manufactures the Predator drones used by the United States Marine Corps, Air Force, and the Central Intelligence Agency (CIA). He is also the managing director of the aircraft manufacturer Spectrum Aeronautical.

== Early life ==
Blue was born in 1936 in Meeker, Colorado. Blue's father was James Elliot Blue, a real-estate developer. Blue's mother was Virginia Neal Blue, the first female treasurer of the state of Colorado. His parents owned Blue and Blue Realtor in Denver, a residential real-estate firm. The family moved from Meeker to Denver when Blue was three, but during his childhood the boy spent part of every summer in Meeker. "Shortly after the end of World War II,” he later recalled, "the city fathers of Meeker decided they needed an airport. My grandfather was a member of the Lions Club; they took on the project of clearing a mesa right outside of the city for the first airport in Meeker". This project, which took place "when he was about 8", sparked his lifelong interest in aviation.

== Education ==
Blue and his brother, Neal, who is a year older, graduated from Denver's East High and Yale University, where they were both in the Air Force ROTC.

He earned his BA from Yale University in 1958, and attended the six-week Advanced Management Program at Harvard Business School.

== Career ==
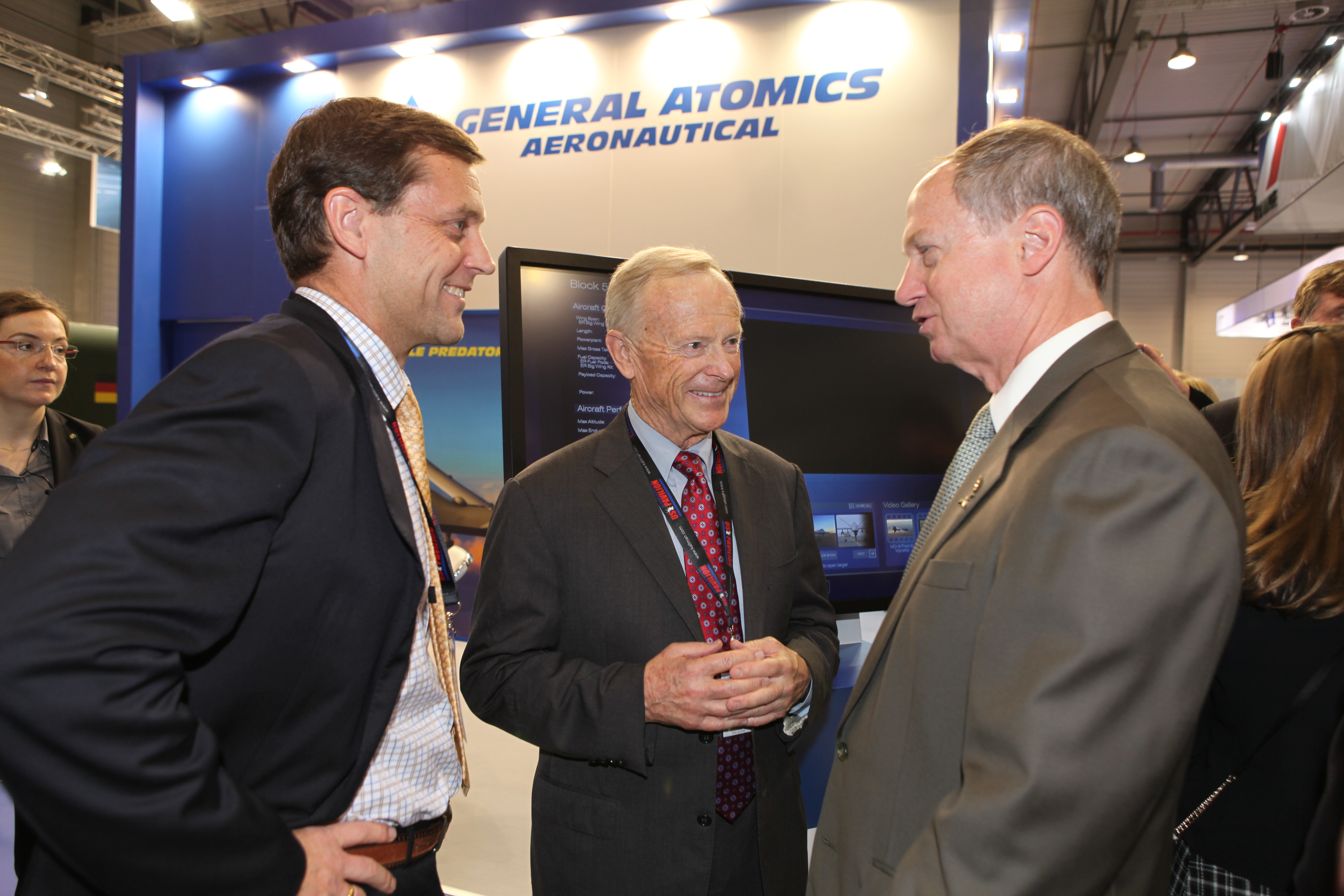
Linden Blue, Neal Blue, and Ambassador John B. Emerson at the Berlin Air Show 2016

He earned his private pilot's license on 17 December 1955. An engine failure while flying a single-engine Stinson Voyager over the jungles of Honduras in 1958 made Blue a believer in twin-engine aircraft. Both the Spectrum S-40 Freedom and Spectrum S-33 Independence are designed to be twin-engine aircraft.

He belonged to the Yale Aviation Club. He and his brother flew around the U.S. and then flew around Latin America and the Caribbean. They became known as the "Flying Blue Brothers" and received extensive attention in the U.S. media, making the cover of LIFE magazine on 8 April 1957. The next year, the brothers started a banana and cacao plantation in Nicaragua in partnership with the family of former President Anastasio Somoza.

In 1961, during a flight from Nicaragua, he was forced to land in Havana, Cuba and was jailed for 12 days, just prior to the Bay of Pigs invasion.

=== SAC and Denver real estate ===
In 1961, he joined the Strategic Air Command; his brother joined the Air Transport Command. Linden served for three years as a SAC security officer, stationed in Denver. After completing his term of service, he and his brother entered the commercial real estate business in Denver with Colorado and Western Properties (C&W).

William Mathews White Jr. sold his entire holdings in Great Western United to C&W on the day he was forced to resign from his company in September 1971. White Jr. had spent the previous few years turning a pair of flour and sugar companies into a conglomerate, bringing in land marketing companies, Shakey's Pizza, and more. After the stock deal, James Neal and C&W's Arthur T. Cowperthwaite were then elected to the Great Western board. By February 1972 White amended the statement, indicating he had sold just under half of his shares, but both James Neal and Cowperthwaite would remain on the board.

=== Cordillera Corporation ===
Forming the Cordillera Corporation, Blue and his brother branched out "into construction, and then ranching and some natural resources—oil and gas", he later explained. Blue serves as chairman of the executive committee of the Denver-based firm, which specializes in real estate, gas utilities, and oil and gas production.

=== Denver city council ===
Entering politics, Blue was elected Denver councilman at large, serving in that position for four years.

=== Harvard Business School ===
Blue then attended Harvard Business School, where he completed a 13-week advanced management program.

=== Gates Learjet ===
In 1975 Blue was hired by Gates Learjet, where he first worked as head of strategic planning, then as executive vice president and general manager of the aircraft division. He later ran the avionics division as well. He stayed at Gates Learjet until 1980, influencing the firm "to be more aggressive in product development and to create higher performance aircraft through aerodynamics".

=== Beech and Raytheon ===
Blue was president and CEO of Beech from 1982 to 1984. While at Beech, he became a director of Raytheon, but left that firm because of "a major disagreement" over the construction of a new airplane model. In the mid-1980s, he and his brother acquired what became the Rocky Mountain jetCenter Network.

=== General Atomics ===
In 1986, Blue and his brother Neal Blue purchased General Atomics, a San Diego–based nuclear physics and defense contractor that had been founded by General Dynamics in 1955 "for the purpose of harnessing the power of nuclear technologies for the benefit of mankind". General Dynamics had then sold the firm to Gulf. Since 1986, Linden Blue has been vice chairman of General Atomics.

He and his brother developed a plane called the Predator to help the Contras in Nicaragua. It has since been used extensively by U.S. forces in Iraq and Afghanistan. On 16 November 2001, a Predator drone killed al-Qaeda commander Muhammad Atef. Another important General Atomics product is the Warrior, which is useful in long-endurance surveillance, communications relay, and weapons delivery. General Atomics won the first Homeland Security contract for an unmanned aircraft system to patrol the U.S. borders.

Blue is vice chairman of General Atomics; his brother Neal is chairman and CEO. Its San Diego facilities "contain over one million square feet of engineering and test facilities, precision manufacturing installations and advanced technology laboratories". It also has operations abroad. Its affiliates include General Atomics Electronic Systems (GA-ESI), ConverDyn, Cotter Corporation, Heathgate Resources, Nuclear Fuels Corporation, and Rio Grande Resources Corporation.

General Atomics has been described as "one of the world's leading resources for high-technology systems development ranging from the nuclear fuel cycle to remotely operated surveillance aircraft, airborne sensors, and advanced electric, electronic, wireless and laser technologies". It "was also one of the early makers of Magnetic Resonance Imaging devices".

=== Spectrum Aeronautical ===
Blue was the managing director of Spectrum Aeronautical, which designed and developed high technology business jets.

== Board memberships and other professional activities ==
Blue has served on the board of overseers of the Center for Naval Analysis; as a trustee and executive committee of the Hudson Institute; as a board member and president of the Green Foundation; as a board member of the National Parks Foundation; as chairman of the Airports and Airways Committee of the General Aviation Manufacturers Association; as a board member of the Burnham Institute; as a board member of the UCSD Foundation; as chairman of the Board of Jobs for San Diego's Graduates; as a board member of Jobs for America's Graduates; as vice chairman of the Denver Planning Board; as a board member of the Denver Symphony, Denver Center for the Performing Arts; as president of the American Council of Young Political Leaders; and as a member of the board and executive committee of the Business and Industry Political Action Committee. Blue is on the board of the Hudson Institute. He is on the board of directors of Jobs for America's Graduates.

== Honors and awards ==
In 2009, Neal and Linden Blue were inducted into San Diego's Entrepreneur Hall of Fame.

Blue's contributions to the aeronautical, energy, and military sciences were recognized by the Industrial Research Institute in 2010 when he was presented the IRI Achievement Award. ] It "recognizes outstanding accomplishment in individual creativity and innovation that broadly contributes to the development of industry and to the benefit of society". Edward Bernstein, president of IRI, said, "IRI is honoring Mr. Blue for his exceptional innovations in military strategy, advanced energy research, and inspirational entrepreneurial skills. Throughout his career, Mr. Blue has constantly integrated technologies into entirely new business areas and markets".

In 2010, Blue was inducted into the International Air & Space Hall of Fame at the San Diego Air & Space Museum.

== Political activities ==
Blue is a longtime Republican donor. In 2011, Blue and Herbert London criticized President Obama in an article for employing "the European model of entitlement, regulation and income redistribution as his guide....It may be one of the few examples in history when a blatantly failed system is employed as a model for success".

== Personal ==
Blue has a brother Neal Blue. In 1970, his mother, Virginia Melba Neal Blue, died. In 1986, his father, James Elliott Blue, died.

In November 2012 it was announced that he plans to marry Ronne Froman, a retired Navy admiral and former chief operating officer for the city of San Diego.
