= Ronne Froman =

U.S. Navy read admiral

Veronica Zasadni ("Ronne") Froman-Blue
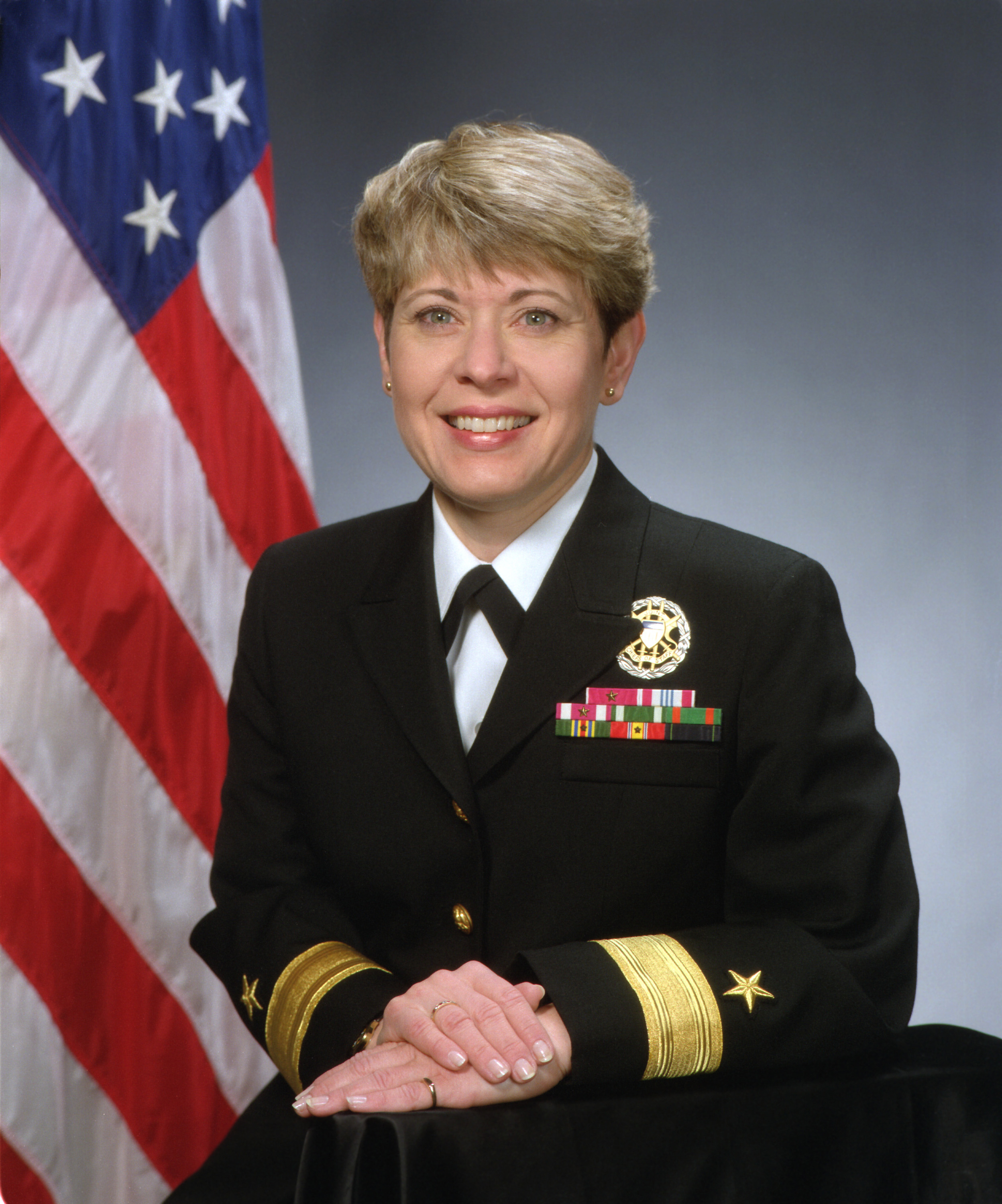
- Rear Admiral Froman in 1995
- Born: 1947 (age 78–79); Uniontown, Pennsylvania, U.S.
- Military career
- Allegiance: United States of America
- Branch: United States Navy
- Service years: 1970–2001
- Rank: Rear admiral
- Nickname: Ronne
- Commands: U.S. Navy Region Southwest
- Awards: Navy Distinguished Service Medal; Department of Defense Distinguished Service Medal
- Other work: Chief Operating Officer, city of San Diego

Veronica Froman-Blue, better known by her maiden name Veronica "Ronne" Froman (RADM, USN, Ret.), is an American retired naval officer. She was the first woman to serve as commander of the United States Navy Region Southwest, a position known as the "Navy Mayor of San Diego". She retired from the Navy in 2001 with the rank of rear admiral, after a 31-year career.

Following her retirement she took on several high-profile civilian positions in San Diego, California: chief of business operations for San Diego Unified School District; CEO of the local chapter of the American Red Cross; and the first chief operating officer for the City of San Diego. She is a strong supporter of Monarch School, a public school for homeless youth; she is the past CEO and chairman of the school's board of directors and still serves on the board.

== Military career ==
Froman was born in Uniontown, Pennsylvania, and graduated from Seton Hill College. She received a Navy commission in 1970 as a General Unrestricted Line Officer. When she retired in 2001 as a rear admiral (two-star admiral), she was one of the highest-ranking female officers in the Navy. During her military career the role of women in the Navy was greatly expanded. "When I joined, we (women) couldn't go to sea; we didn't have command; there were no lady admirals", she said in 2009. "It kind of evolved over the years I was in the Navy."

Her assignments during her 31-year career included commanding the Navy's Southwest Region from 1997 until 2000. She was the first woman to hold that position. The command supports Navy shore installations in six western states and is headquartered in San Diego. The commander of the Southwest Region is often referred to as the "Navy Mayor of San Diego". At the time the Southwest Region employed approximately 86,000 sailors and 35,000 civilians. There were 56 ships, five submarines and 600 aircraft home-ported in the region.

She also served two high-level assignments at the Pentagon, including Director of Shore Readiness for the Chief of Naval Operations from 2000 to 2001. During her time on active duty she received the U.S. Department of Defense Distinguished Service Medal and the United States Navy Distinguished Service Medal.

== Civilian career ==
Following her retirement from the Navy she settled in San Diego. She served as chief of business operations for the San Diego Unified School District from 2001 till 2003. She is credited with trimming millions of dollars from district business operations during that time.

In 2003 she became CEO of the San Diego–Imperial Counties chapter of the American Red Cross. She was recruited to that position by chapter chairman Jerry Sanders to restore the unit's reputation and credibility. The chapter had come under heavy criticism because of controversy over the use of funds donated for the relief of victims of a 2001 wildfire. She instituted changes in accountability and transparency which earned praise when the region was again struck by fire in 2003.

In 2005 Sanders ran for mayor of San Diego in a special election, promising that if elected he would appoint Froman as his second-in-command. When he took office in January 2006 he appointed her as the first-ever Chief Operating Officer of the city, with functions similar to a city manager. She resigned in June 2007 and took a position as senior vice president for the energy group of General Atomics.

She has had a longtime interest in homeless issues and particularly in Monarch School, a public K-12 school for students who are at risk or actually impacted by homelessness. She served on the school project's board of directors since 2004 and served as interim vice president of the public-private partnership. In July 2011 she took over as CEO of the nonprofit organization. In January 2012 she became chairman of the organization's board of directors.

Since 2010 she has been the CEO and chair of REBOOT, a program to help military veterans transition to civilian life. She has several times served as the honorary chair of San Diego Fleet Week.

== Personal life ==
She is married to Linden Blue, co-owner of General Atomics.
