= Neal Blue =

American aviation executive

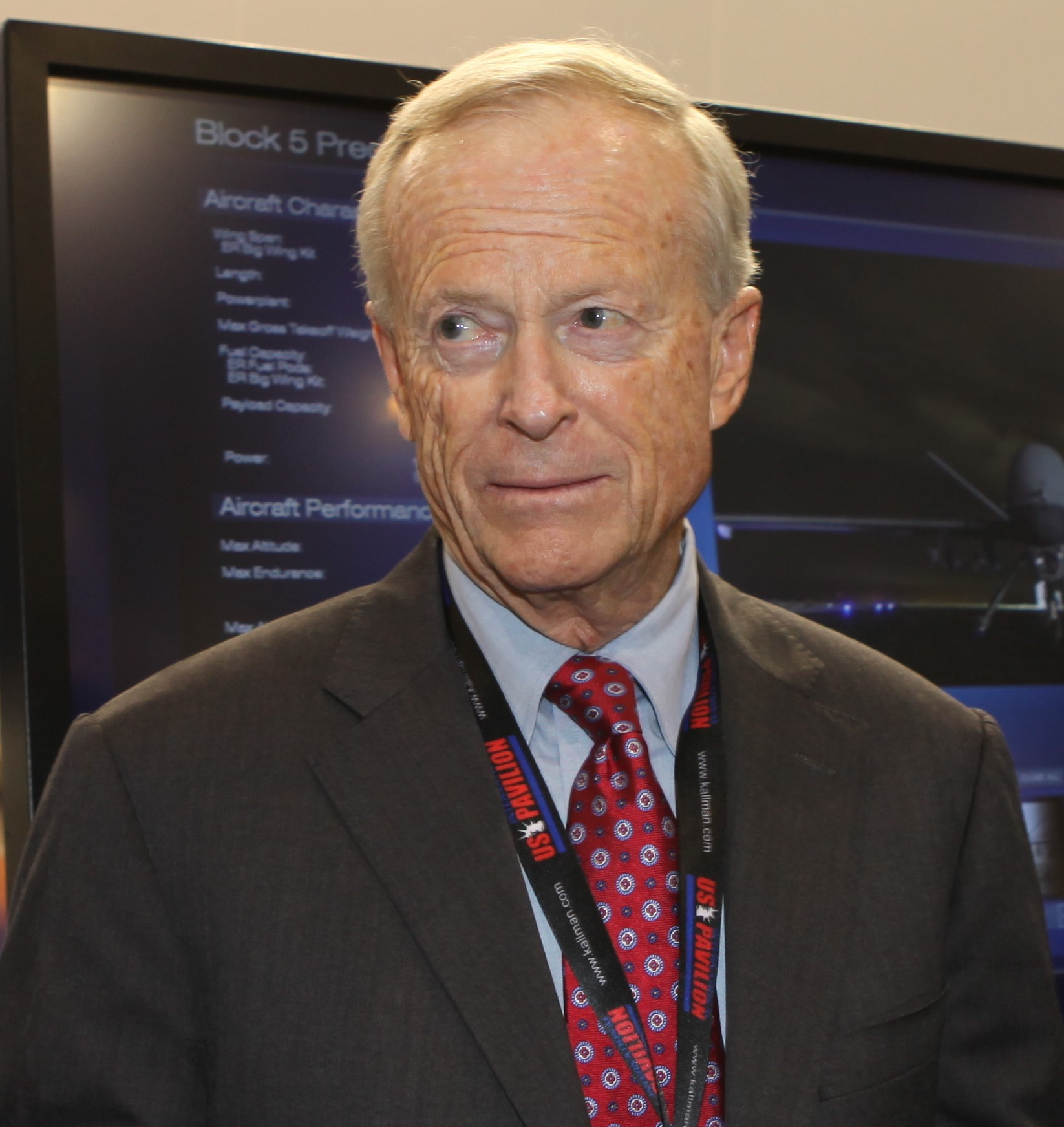
- Neal Blue in 2016
- Born: James Neal Blue; 1935 (age 90–91); Meeker, Colorado, US
- Education: Yale University
- Occupation: Businessman
- Known for: Co-owner, chairman, and CEO of General Atomics
- Mother: Virginia Neal Blue
- Relatives: Linden Blue (brother)

James Neal Blue (born 1935) is an American billionaire businessman, and the chief executive officer and chairman of General Atomics based in San Diego, California.

== Early life ==
Blue was born in 1935 in Meeker, Colorado, the son of James Elliot Blue and Virginia Neal Blue, a partner in the Denver residential real estate firm of Blue and Blue.

== Education ==
Blue attended Yale University. During college, he was in the Air Force Reserve Officers' Training Corps.

== Career ==
Neal and his brother Linden Blue owned the Colorado and Western Properties firm in Colorado in the 1970s. William Mathews White Jr. sold his entire holdings in Great Western United to Colorado and Western on the day he was forced to resign from his company in September 1971. White Jr. had spent the previous few years turning a pair of flour and sugar companies into a conglomerate, bringing in land marketing companies, Shakey's Pizza, and more. After the stock deal, James Neal and C&W's Arthur T. Cowperthwaite were then elected to the Great Western board. By February 1972 White amended the statement, indicating he had sold just under half of his shares, but both James Neal and Cowperthwaite would remain on the board.

Neal and Linden acquired General Atomics in 1986 from Chevron Oil for a reported $60 million. Neal serves as chairman and chief executive officer of General Atomics, which specializes in diversified research, development and manufacturing in defense, energy and other advanced technology arenas.

== Awards ==
- 2013: 29th annual International von Karman Wings Award (October 2013)
- 2023: John R. Alison Award presented by the Air & Space Forces Association

== Personal ==
Blue's brother is Linden Blue, the vice-chairman of General Atomics.
