= Virginia Neal Blue =

American businesswoman and politician

45th Treasurer of Colorado
- In office 1967–1970
- Preceded by: Homer Bedford
- Succeeded by: Julia Swearingen

Personal details
- Born: 1910 Meeker, Colorado, U.S.
- Died: 1970 (aged 59–60)
- Party: Republican
- Spouse: James Elliott Blue
- Children: Neal Blue; Linden Blue
- Education: University of Colorado
- Occupation: Politician, businesswoman

Virginia Neal Blue (1910-1970) was an American businesswoman and politician, Colorado State Treasurer from 1967 to 1970, and the first woman elected to executive office in the state.

== Early life ==
Virginia Neal Blue was born in Meeker, Colorado. She earned a bachelor's degree in economics from the University of Colorado in 1931.

== Career ==
Blue was one of the Regents of the University of Colorado, the governing board of the University of Colorado system, from 1953 to 1959, and chairman of the Colorado Commission on the Status of Women from 1964 to 1966. She was Colorado State Treasurer from 1967 to 1970, and the first woman elected to executive office in the state.

== Personal life ==
She married James Elliott Blue (1907-1986). Their sons Neal Blue and Linden Blue took a subsidiary of General Dynamics private as General Atomics.
