= Honeywell Uranium Hexafluoride Processing Facility =

Uranium conversion facility in Illinois, United States

Coordinates: 37.171768°N 88.757039°W

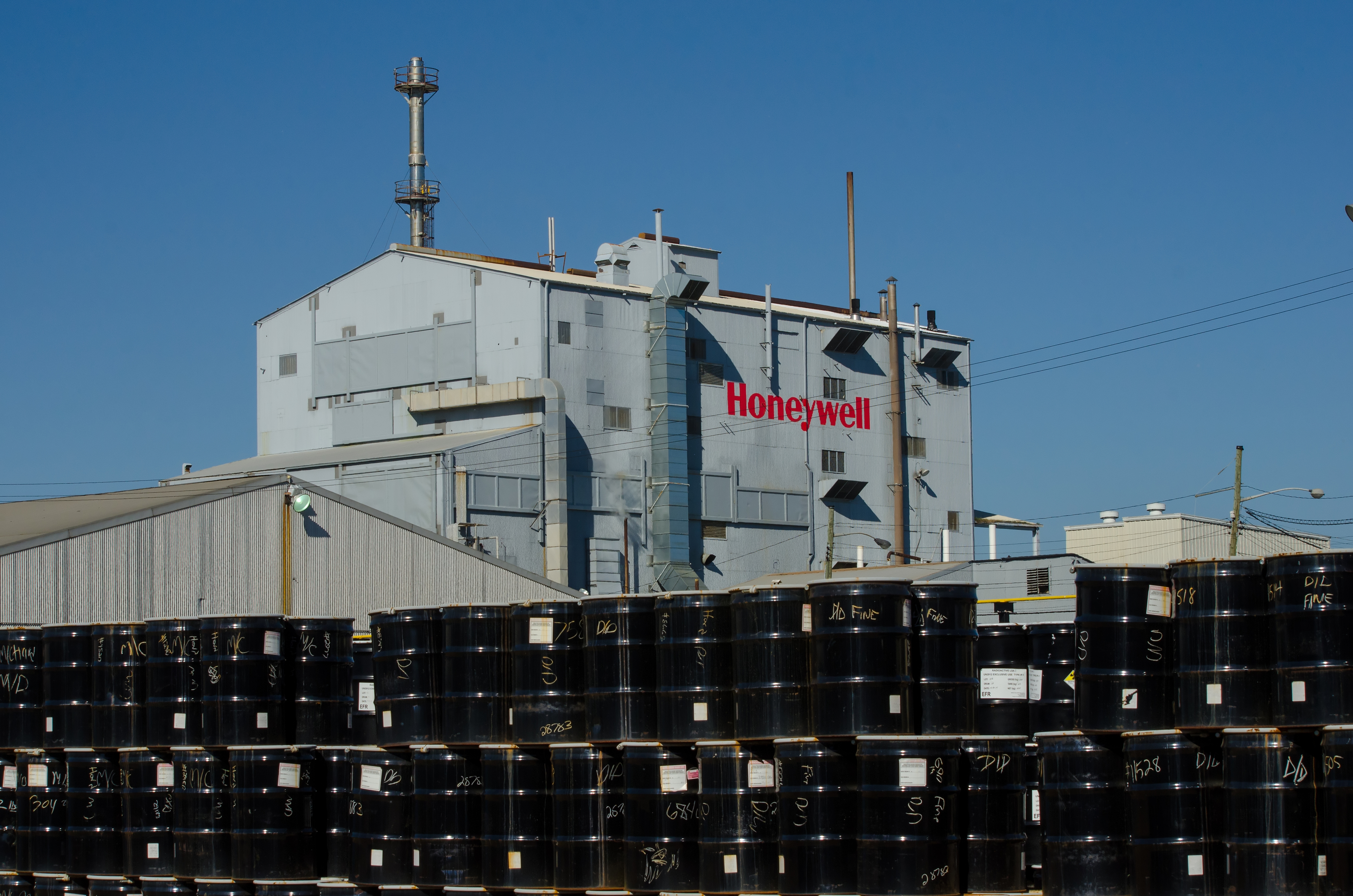
The Honeywell Uranium Hexafluoride Processing Facility

The Honeywell Uranium Hexafluoride Processing Facility, a uranium conversion facility, is located 1.9 miles (3 km) northwest of Metropolis, Illinois, United States. The plant, Honeywell Specialty Chemicals in Metropolis, Illinois, has a nominal capacity of 15,000 tU as uranium hexafluoride per year. ConverDyn, a general partnership between affiliates of Honeywell and General Atomics, is the exclusive agent for conversion sales from the Honeywell Uranium Hexafluoride Processing Facility.

== History ==
Built in 1958, the Honeywell Metropolis Works Facility is the only uranium hexafluoride conversion facility in the United States. The plant has an annual conversion capacity of approximately 15,000 tU as UF_{6} accounting for approximately 20% of worldwide production capacity. The plant feeds U_{3}O_{8} yellowcake received from uranium mines and produces uranium hexafluoride gas for enrichment at one of the primary enrichment sites around the world. After being enriched, product is fabricated into nuclear fuel that ends up generating electricity at a nuclear power plant.

== Conversion process ==
Honeywell Metropolis Works deploys a unique technology and process by which it converts yellowcake to uranium hexafluoride gas. The other Western conversion facilities, Areva and Cameco, each utilize a process that requires two different facilities, one to convert yellowcake to either uranium tetrafluoride or uranium trioxide and another to convert to uranium hexafluoride. Honeywell developed a process known as the dry fluoride volatility conversion process that allows for complete yellowcake to UF_{6} at a single facility and also yielding a greater level of UF_{6} purity at 99.99% or higher.

The dry fluoride volatility conversion process at Metropolis works goes through five basic steps: feed preparation, reduction, hydrofluorination, fluorination, and distillation.

- Feed preparation

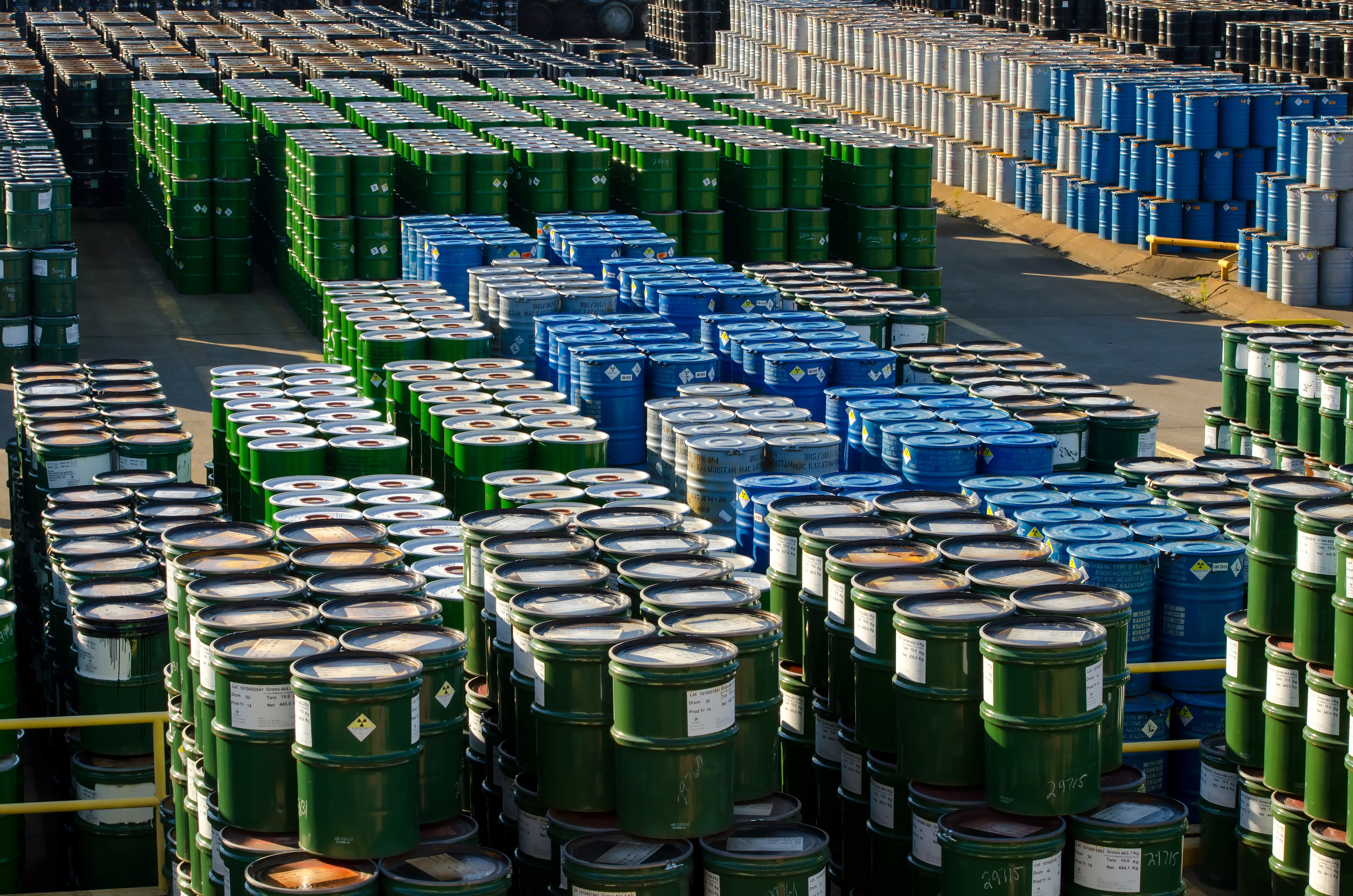
Uranium ore concentrate storage at the Metropolis Works Facility

The aim of this initial step is to ensure that uranium concentrates have the optimum particle size and density necessary to move forward in the process of conversion.

- Reduction

During this stage, uranium ore concentrates are converted to uranium dioxide and impurities are removed from the system into a waste gas stream. The sized yellowcake is reacted with hydrogen in a fluidizing medium to form uranium dioxide

U_{3}O_{8}+2H_{2} → 3UO_{2} + 2H_{2}O

- Hydrofluorination

The UO_{2} resulting from the previous reduction stage is then converted into uranium tetrafluoride intermediate (Green Salt) and additional impurities are removed from the system.

UO_{2}+4HF → UF_{4} + 2H_{2}O

- Fluorination

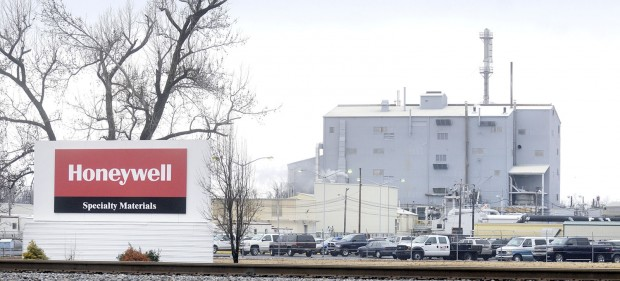
Honeywell Metropolis Works Facility in Metropolis, Illinois

The Metropolis Works Plant operates the largest gaseous fluorine capacity in the world. Fluorine is produced in this process by the electrolysis of HF in a potassium bifluoride substrate. The fluorine is pulled to the fluorination process under vacuum so as to increase the safety of this step. The result of this step is crude uranium hexafluoride gas.

UF_{4}+F_{2} → UF_{6}

- Distillation

Finally, uranium hexafluoride from the previous step is purified in a two-stage distillation system. The crude UF_{6} is vaporized and transferred through a boiling system into cold traps. After cooling, the final product is filled into cylinders for transport. This stage is proprietary Honeywell technology which allows output of 99.99% or greater UF_{6}.

=== 2012 required plant upgrades ===
After the Fukushima Daiichi nuclear disaster in 2011, the United States Nuclear Regulatory Commission conducted inspections at all US nuclear facilities for seismic deficiencies and general resistance to natural disasters. Although initial inspections confirmed that the Metropolis Works Facility was in full compliance with its operating license, the NRC shut down the plant in May 2012 and required a series of upgrades to improve resilience to natural disasters including earthquakes and tornadoes. Honeywell elected to complete required upgrades and the plant restarted production of uranium hexafluoride in July 2013, after more than a year offline.

== Incidents ==
=== 2003 UF_{6} release ===
At 2:45 CST on 12/22/03, a small release of Uranium hexafluoride occurred lasting approximately 45 minutes. At 3:00 CST the licensee declared a Site Area Emergency, indicating failure of systems design to prevent risk to the public. All personnel were evacuated within a 1-mile (1.6 km) radius. About 25 people offsite were temporarily evacuated and some 75 persons remained sheltered for a time in their homes. Licensee notified State of Illinois. NRC was notified at 0400 CST.

The licensee terminated the Site Area Emergency at 6:50 CST on 12/22/03.

=== 2010 labor dispute ===
At the conclusion of regularly scheduled collective bargaining between Honeywell and United Steelworkers local 7-669, the largest resident union at the Metropolis facility, the company locked out union members when they refused to ratify a new agreement with several concessions. The Union continued to work for seven days without an agreement until the company initiated the lockout on June 28, 2010. The lockout lasted until August 1, 2011, when the union ratified a new three year collective bargaining agreement.

=== 2014 labor dispute ===
After failing to come to an agreement at the expiration of the 2011 collective bargaining agreement, Honeywell locked out the United Steelworkers local 7-669 on August 1, 2014. The lockout ended on March 27, 2015, after the union ratified a new three-year agreement with Honeywell.

=== 2014 UF_{6} release ===
On October 26, 2014, a small amount of uranium hexafluoride was released inside of the facility. Honeywell attributed the accident to an equipment failure and the Nuclear Regulatory Commission began an investigation of the plant to make sure safety procedures were followed. After completing their investigation, the NRC affirmed that the leak was the result of an equipment failure and that the leak was entirely contained within the building. The NRC affirmed that what appeared to be a visible cloud of gas was the result of water cannons which are a part of the emergency response process in the event of a release. After the NRC and Honeywell completed all required procedures and assured that the facility was safe to continue operation, Honeywell Metropolis Works resumed production of UF_{6} on November 7, 2014.

== See also ==
- Nuclear fuel cycle
