= Monarch School (San Diego) =

Coordinates: 32°43′19.96″N 117°10′13.47″W

- San Diego, California; United States

Information
- Type: Public-private partnership
- Established: 1988
- Principal and CEO: Dyane Plumley and Afira DeVries
- Grades: K-12
- Website: http://www.monarchschools.org/

Monarch School is a public K-12 school in San Diego, California, which is exclusively for students who are homeless, at risk of being homeless, or impacted by homelessness. It was founded in 1988. At that time it was the only such school in the United States.

As of 2021 it is still the largest and most comprehensive K-12 program for homeless students in the U.S. The school enrolls approximately 350 students ranging in age from 4 to 19. Monarch is accredited by the Western Association of Schools and Colleges (WASC) and aligned with Common Core Standards.

== History ==
Monarch School is a public-private partnership between the San Diego County Office of Education and the nonprofit Monarch School Project. The nonprofit organization was initially headed by Ronne Froman, a former Navy admiral and former chief operating officer of the City of San Diego. In January 2012, Froman became chairman of the board of directors and Erin Spiewak replaced her as CEO. Spiewak's involvement with the school began in 2003 as a volunteer; in 2004 she was named volunteer of the year.

The school originated in 1988 as "The PLACE," an acronym for Progressive Learning Alternative for Children's Education. It began as a drop-in center, then found a small location to function as a school in 1990. It started with just one teacher, Sandra McBrayer, who was later named the national Teacher of the Year in 1994. McBrayer had been teaching juvenile offenders in the court school system when she came up with the idea of a school specifically for homeless children. "I realized that part of our responsibility is to take school to the students and not just wait for them to come to us," she said in 1994.

From 2001 until 2013 the campus was located on West Cedar Street in the Little Italy neighborhood of downtown San Diego. That facility started with 48 students; by 2002 it had reached its capacity of 150 students. By 2009 enough classrooms were added to be able to serve students from kindergarten through 12th grade. The school grew to be over capacity and had to turn away eligible students, according to Froman.

Ground was broken in February 2012 for a much larger facility in a remodeled warehouse at 1625 Newton Street in the East Village neighborhood. The estimated cost of the new facility is $14.4 million, most of which came from private donations. The new location opened in May 2013 and is named the Nat & Flora Bosa Campus, to honor a couple who donated the money to purchase the West Cedar Street location, as well as giving $5 million toward construction of the new campus. The facility can serve up to 350 students a day. In addition to a comprehensive educational program, the school is able to provide for other needs such as food, hygiene, clothing, school supplies, transportation and counseling.

In 2016, The Launch Point was opened to students. It included a construction lab to support a Career Technical Education pathway as well as a career academy for high school students.

In 2017, the Parent Resource Center and Parent Classroom were opened to give caregivers a chance to connect with staff and welcome parents as partners in education.

Since 2018, 124 students have had their poems published in the annual edition of More Odes to Common Things. There ae currently 6 volumes.
