= Spectrum Aeronautical =

American very light business jet developer (1995–2021)

Spectrum Aeronautical, LLC
- Company type: Private
- Industry: aerospace
- Founded: 1995
- Headquarters: Carlsbad, California, United States
- Key people: Linden Blue
- Products: very light jets
- Website: spectrum.aero

Spectrum Aeronautical was a business jet developer based in Carlsbad, California, with its development center located in Spanish Fork, Utah. The company went out of business in January 2021.

An engine failure while flying a single-engine Stinson Voyager over the jungles of Honduras in 1958 nearly killed Spectrum CEO Linden Blue. After this incident he started to design aircraft that had multiple engines.

Since approximately 2006, the company was involved in the development of two very light jets, the Spectrum S-33 "Independence" and the S-40 "Freedom", which were to be constructed with extensive use of composite materials. The twin-engined single pilot aircraft were planned to carry between five and nine passengers over distances between circa 3000 and 4000 kilometres, using about 40% less fuel than conventionally built planes. The certification dates of both planes were postponed on several occasions, more so after a setback in 2006, when the company's only prototype - a S-33 - crashed, killing its two pilots. Further, the Great Recession reduced demand for business jets.

The S-33, with an envisaged selling price of just under US-$ 4m, was scheduled to be certified 12 months after the S-40, which was to sell for below US-$ 7m. In recent years Spectrum had sought financing through banks, investors and joint ventures with other aircraft manufacturers. In May 2011 Spectrum president Austin Blue was quoted: "We are still trying to get the programmes advancing, but it is not easy".

== Advertised claims ==
Spectrum took part in the development of composite aircraft which includes the MQ-1 Predator, LearAvia Lear Fan, Beechcraft Starship, Scaled Composites Proteus, Bell Eagle Eye and Williams V-Jet II.

It gained experience in advanced aerodynamic design, manufacturing process controls, financial management, FAA certification, interior design, marketing, computer based design, quality assurance, distribution and maintenance systems during its development projects.

== Products ==
The company had worked on developing two jets:

- Spectrum S-40 Freedom
- Spectrum S-33 Independence
