= Western Sugar Cooperative =

American sugar cooperative

- Type: Agricultural marketing cooperative
- Founded: 1901
- Headquarters: Denver, Colorado, United States
- Area served: Colorado
- Products: sugar
- Website: www.westernsugar.com

The Western Sugar Cooperative is a grower owned American agricultural cooperative originating from the Great Western Sugar Company in 1901.

== Great Western Sugar Company History ==
The Great Western Sugar Company was incorporated in February 1901 by Charles Boettcher and others including John F. Campion, after having difficulty making their Colorado Sugar Manufacturing Company factory in Grand Junction, Colorado, a success and selling it to locals. Colorado Sugar had an agreement to build a plant in Loveland, Colorado, in 1899, with the Utah Sugar Company eyeing expansion into Colorado, and Colorado Sugar lacking resources to follow through quickly, they gave their Loveland agreement to Great Western. Great Western brought in other high-level investors (Eben Smith, David Moffat, William Jackson Palmer, James Joseph Brown), created the Great Western Construction Company, then had the subsidiary build their first sugar beet processing plant, opening on November 21, 1901. The first year was a failure, both for beet quality and problems at the factory, so they hired Mark Austin from Utah Sugar to improve their situation.

Great Western created the Great Western Railway subsidiary in 1902, which allowed an expansion of the territory a beet sugar factory could collect from. Great Western also created the Loveland Construction Company, which built the railway, primarily with Japanese workers. By 1976 the railway had 58 miles (93 km) of track, all standard gauge.

Rounds of price wars with the Sugar Trust in 1900-1902 eliminated Great Western's Colorado competitors, and the Trust acquired control of Great Western by 1904. The Trust set prices, trained factories and farmers, assigned plants and farmers to regional "beet districts" to prevent plants from competing against each other with the farmers, but left the factories independent to conduct other business. In 1905 Great Western was reestablished as a New Jersey corporation and acquired four Colorado factories.

Colorado was the largest producer of beet sugar by 1906. By 1926 there were a total of 17 factories, including 13 from Great Western.

Starting at its creation in 1901, Great Western brought in families of Germans from Russia, who had experience with sugar beet farming; single Japanese men, until immigration restrictions eliminated them in 1907; and, Mexican workers to help with the labors of sugar beet farming. The Germans from Russia were preferred for their experience at producing high beet yields. Their upward mobility, not afforded to Hispanic workers, meant they contributed less in the labor pool. By the 1910s and the 1920s the Hispanic/Mexican farmworkers had taken over the need for beet labor.

Great Western cut contract prices to farmers in the 1910s and 1920s, leading to the "Loveland Resolutions" accord by farmers associations against the company. Colorado passed the Cooperative Marketing Law in 1923, allowing co-ops as legal entities. This allowed farmers to present a united front and raise the contract prices of beets. This, fewer farmers planting beets, and curly top disease lowering yields caused Great Western to create a profit-sharing contract, splitting the profits from selling the sugar 50-50. This became standard for the industry.

The Great Depression in 1929 substantially reduced both demand and prices, nearly ruining the industry. Tariffs were passed, which did not help. The Sugar Trust lobbied and got included in the Agricultural Adjustment Act (AAA) through the Jones–Costigan amendment. This reduced imports and set base prices on sugar. The Dust Bowl continued the interwar period traumas to the industry. Some farmers were protected from drought per the Colorado-Big Thompson Project, created through farm and industry lobbying.

World War II

World War II brought an end to the Depression and drought, and brought back consumer demand. The lack of labor incentivized change: more reliable seeds were developed, which meant labor-intensive thinning and blocking was unnecessary and mechanical harvesting was perfected becoming rapidly adopted. However, AAA kept a cap on prices and profitability, hindering recovery. A long drought also hit in the 1950s.

During the war, Great Western sought employees from the Heart Mountain Japanese American internment camp. An announcement on 2 April 1943 described "choice contracts" for Heart Mountain workers, and a quarter-page Great Western ad in September 1943 discussed pricing, transportation, and said "Many farmers need help to harvest the sugar beet crop. You will be welcomed by the public and your efforts will be appreciated." During the 1942-1945 seasons, Japanese American laborers brought in 20% of the sugar beet crop in the nation, despite deep hatred and racism. After the war, Great Western offered relocation to families to work as laborers in near Billings and Lovell.

A byproduct of the process was molasses that could not be crystallized into sugar. This was used as food, sold as livestock feed, or distilled into alcohol. Beginning in the 1950s, it was put through the Steffen process to produce monosodium glutamate (MSG). Great Western had one MSG plant in Fort Collins.

William M. White Jr.

In 1965, William M. White Jr., at age 25, was a vice president at Allen & Company. Invited back to Colorado from New York by James A. Krentler, the two acquired Denver's Colorado Milling and Elevator Company (established 1885) in that year, then used that to take over Great Western in 1968. Great Western merged with Colorado Milling and became Great Western United Corporation with White as the president. Colorado Milling and Elevator was sold in 1967 or 1969 to Peavey Flour Co. White Jr. was the fourth generation of his family to be involved with Great Western, and his father was a director at the time of the takeover. White Jr. described the merged company as "big enough to do anything we want". Robert R. Owen joined that year as the Great Western Sugar president, coming from Ford Motors. He remained president until 1971. The Colorado City, Colorado, and California City, California, land developments, both part of Nathan "Nat" K. Mendelsohn's California City Development Company, were added in 1968, becoming Great Western Cities, with Mendelsohn joining Great Western. For various reasons, all of these companies struggled in 1969-1970.

White acquired the Emerald Christmas Tree Company, which grew Christmas trees and distributed and sold them, prepackaged, to retailers. It was acquired in 1968 for $1.5 million. It then lost $1 million in its first year and was sold for a loss in 1970. Colorado Milling was also sold in 1970 for $10 million, also at a loss.

Timothy Wirth, a vice president of Great Western Cities, described White reading Future Shock in 1970 and then sending copies to company directors to bridge the gap between the "very young management" and the older management.

By the 1970s, The New York Times described Great Western as a "house of cards". In 1971 White had canceled cash dividends a month after promising at the annual meeting to not do so. This broke a nearly 40-year streak of dividends being paid at the company. White was willing to sell Colorado Milling and Great Western Sugar, but was dismissed as CEO in 1971, much of it through Mendelsohn's efforts. As the largest preferred shareholder, Mendelsohn launched a proxy fight for the company in 1972 to replace the directors and prevent the company from being split up.

GWU's stock price dropped by more than a factor of 10 between late 1971 and mid-1973. Investigations of price fixing by six sugar producers including Great Western closed in 1974 with criminal indictments; the Justice Department and Council on Wage and Price Stability also investigated why prices had spiked 300-400% in 1974.

Takeovers

Hunt International Resources acquired Great Western in late 1974 as a hostile takeover as the price fixing indictments came in, as the Hunt brothers attempted to corner the sugar market. They owned a combined 65% of the outstanding stock by 1976. They then removed the board of directors and executive leadership and moved the executive offices to the First National Bank Tower in Dallas, Texas, leaving the corporate office in Denver. They also added two lines of business: commodities trading and oil and gas exploration and development.

Sugar prices remained high in 1975 even after the price fixing indictments were issued, even though the United States Sugar Act of 1937, which removed import quotas, also expired in 1974. Prices then began to deflate rapidly. By 1977 the industry was asking for government subsidies after the price deflation.

In June 1975, GWU acquired Godchaux-Henderson Sugar, a cane sugar producer in New Orleans, from Southern Industries Corporation for $2.65 million cash, as well as making agreements on unsecured notes. This included their cane refinery in Reserve, Louisiana, which processed cane from local fields and from overseas, and a deepwater dock that was completed in 1973. In 1975-1976 they had contracts for raw cane from Corporation Azucarera La Victoria of Panama and the Philippine Exchange Company. GWU and Southern Industries sued each other in 1976 over the notes.

The Rocky Mountain Beet Growers Association formed in 1971, and was later known as the Great Western Producers Co-Operative. Robert R. Owen, formerly Great Western Sugar's head until being demoted by White in 1971, became the co-op's head. As a farmers co-op, it attempted to buy the sugar division in 1971-1972 and again in 1973-1974 for $43.5 million. The 1974 effort failed after an increase in sugar prices led to record profits, which made the co-op's bid look undervalued. Great Western United sued in 1975 to void the contract and the co-op counterclaimed that United had failed to represent them accurately in proxy statements. The co-op lost the case in 1975, as well as on appeal in 1978 and on second appeal to the Colorado Supreme Court in 1980.

In 1984 three divisions were put for sale: Godchaux-Henderson Sugar Company (Reserve, Louisiana), the Northern Ohio Sugar Company and the Great Western Railway Company. Holly Sugar expressed interest in buying Northern Ohio and Godchaux-Henderson but talks fell through in June 1984. By 1985 Great Western was described as "one of the many trouble spots" in the Hunt group, and Great Western filed Chapter 11 bankruptcy in March 1985. Savannah Foods & Industries purchased the Fremont, Ohio plant and Findlay, Ohio storage facility.

In 1985, Tate & Lyle created the Western Sugar Company and purchased six of the factories: Greeley, Fort Morgan, Scottsbluff, Bayard, and Billings. They apparently also bought Loveland closed it down in 1985. By 2002 Western Sugar was still operating the Greeley and Fort Morgan factories.

In 2002, more than 1000 sugar beet growers purchased the company, creating the Rocky Mountain Sugar Growers Co-operative. Later that year it merged into the Western Sugar Cooperative.

The organization was headquartered in Denver. It has five factories, located at Fort Morgan, Colorado, Scottsbluff, Nebraska, Torrington and Lovell, Wyoming, and Billings, Montana.

In May 2015 the co-op announced it would be ending production at the Torrington site and would only use that site for storage. As such it plans to reduce the workforce at its Torrington site from 76 staffers to just 6. The changes were set to take effect late 2016, however as of early 2018 it is still fully operable.

By 1976, related subsidiaries of GWU included:

- The Great Western Sugar Company (incorporated in Delaware)
  - The Bighorn Limestone Company (incorporated in Montana)
  - Great Western Employment Agency, Inc. (incorporated in Texas, nonprofit; inactive by 1976)
  - Godchaux-Henderson Sugar., Inc. (incorporated in Louisiana)
  - Northern Ohio Sugar Company (incorporated in Ohio)
  - The Great Western Railway Company (incorporated in Colorado)
  - The Great Western Sugar Export Company (incorporated in Colorado)
  - The Great Western Sugar Leasing Company (incorporated in Delaware; inactive by 1976)
- The Great Western Sugar Investment Company (incorporated in Delaware)

== Leadership ==
Frank A. Kemp was named CEO in 1936 and remained so until 1967. He was elected chairman of the board in 1966, and died in 1971. It was noted that out of his $534,000 estate, there were no stock holdings in Great Western.

William Mathews White Jr. (at age 28), became president in 1968 (after being head of Colorado Milling since 1965 until it was merged into GWU). In early 1967 White attempted to buy and merge Gorton's Fish into Colorado/GWU, acquiring 30 percent, but failed and sold the shares six months later.

White Jr., (born ca 1940), was the son of the wealthy William M. White (1911-7 September 1966), noted for founding many companies in Colorado, including White and Davis Department Store, the first in the state, and controlling several Colorado-based banks. William Jr. graduated from Yale in 1961 and joined Allen & Company, becoming vice president by 1965 (at age 25). By 1972, in a Wall Street Journal describing his downfall, he was described as "a young kid who was copying the Lings and Perots, but didn't have in his bones an understanding of what they were doing." It described how he lost Krentler's support after White berated Mendelsohn and others in a contentious 1971 board meeting; Krentler said "Making fun of someone in front of people is not my idea of fun. Nat Mendelsohn is a human being. I can't stand to see human beings treated like that." The next day, the directors voted unanimously for White to resign.

White was named tongue-in-cheek in a Cervi's Journal article, nominating him as a 1971 Denver Man Of The Year for "his classic execution of the lateral arabesque (see The Peter Principle)". After his ousting, he immediately announced he sold all of his common stock holdings to Colorado and Western Properties for cash and stock; Colorado and Western was owned by Neal Blue and Linden Blue. Neal and C&W's Arthur T. Cowperthwaite were then elected to the Great Western board. By February 1972 White amended the statement, indicating he had sold just under half of his shares, but both Neal and Cowperthwaite would remain on the board.

By November 1972 Robert G. Everett was president and CEO.

== Sugar beet factories ==
Sugar beets rapidly lost sugar content after harvesting, meaning many of the industrial processing factories were required. Listed in approximate acquisition order:

- Loveland, Colorado built in 1901, 1,950 short tons (1,770 t) capacity in 1919. Described above. 3,400 short tons (3,100 t) capacity in 1976. Permanently closed in 1985.
- Greeley, Colorado, built by the Greeley Sugar Company in 1902 and sold to the Sugar Trust in the same year. 1,050 short tons (950 t) capacity in 1919. Became part of Great Western in 1905. 2,200 short tons (2,000 t) capacity in 1976.
- Longmont, Colorado, built in 1903, became part of Great Western in 1905. 2,350 short tons (2,130 t) capacity in 1919. 3,000 short tons (2,700 t) capacity in 1976. Was also home to a Great Western experimental station and research farms.
- Fort Collins, Colorado, built in 1903 against the Poudre River for the Fort Collins Sugar Manufacturing Company. Had a Steffen house (to recover sugar from molasses, later to extract MSG). Became part of Great Western in 1905. 2,150 short tons (1,950 t) capacity in 1919. Closed in 1960. 40.59391°N 105.06197°W
- Eaton, Colorado, built in 1902, became part of Great Western in 1905. 1,200 short tons (1,100 t) capacity in 1919. 2,000 short tons (1,800 t) capacity in 1976. Closed in 1976, as Great Western had four other plants within 50 miles (80 km).
- Windsor, Colorado, built 1903, became part of Great Western in 1905. 1,150 short tons (1,040 t) capacity in 1919. Closed in 1968; Eastman Kodak began using the plant in 1968, calling it Kodak Colorado.
- Sterling, Colorado, built by locals in 1905 and acquired by Great Western in 1906. 1,050 short tons (950 t) capacity in 1919. 2,500 short tons (2,300 t) capacity in 1976. Closed in 1985.
- Fort Morgan, Colorado, built by Great Western in 1906. 1,200 short tons (1,100 t) capacity in 1919. 3,200 short tons (2,900 t) capacity in 1976.
- Brush, Colorado, built by Great Western in 1906. 1,100 short tons (1,000 t) capacity in 1919.
- Billings, Montana, acquired by Great Western in 1906, initially operated under its own name to escape antitrust scrutiny. 2,000 short tons (1,800 t) capacity in 1919. 4,100 short tons (3,700 t) capacity in 1976.
- Scottsbluff, Nebraska, built by Great Western in 1910 by moving an 1899 Standard Beet Company (Heyward G. Leavitt) factory from Ames, Nebraska, which had closed in 1906. 2,000 short tons (1,800 t) capacity in 1919. 3,200 short tons (2,900 t) capacity in 1976.
- Gering, Nebraska, built by Great Western in 1916. 1,100 short tons (1,000 t) capacity, raised to 1,200 short tons (1,100 t) by 1935. 2,100 short tons (1,900 t) capacity in 1976.
- Lovell, Wyoming, built by Great Western in 1916, 600 short tons (540 t) capacity in 1919. 2,100 short tons (1,900 t) capacity in 1976.
- Bayard, Nebraska, built by Great Western in 1917. 1,000 short tons (910 t) capacity in 1919. 2,200 short tons (2,000 t) capacity in 1976.
- Brighton, Colorado, built by Great Western in 1917. 1,000 short tons (910 t) capacity in 1919. 2,200 short tons (2,000 t) capacity in 1976. Closed 1978.
- Mitchell, Nebraska, built by Great Western in 1920. Had been requested by farmers since the Scottsbluff plant was built. 1,300 short tons (1,200 t) capacity in 1919. 2,150 short tons (1,950 t) capacity in 1976.
- Ovid, Colorado, built by Great Western in 1924, 2,700 short tons (2,400 t) capacity in 1976. closed 1985.
- Johnstown, Colorado, along Big Thompson River. Originally started as a sugar factory in 1920, construction completed as a molasses refinery in 1926. Molasses was shipped here and recovered to confectioners sugar. MSG processing added in 1954.
- Fort Lupton, Colorado, built by Industrial Sugar in 1919, acquired by Great Western in 1926. Closed 1948.
- Lyman, Nebraska, built by Great Western in 1926. 1,300 short tons (1,200 t) capacity in 1935.
- Goodland, Kansas, built by Great Western in 1968, called the Frank A. Kemp Sugar Factory. 1,300 short tons (1,200 t) capacity in 1968, 3,400 short tons (3,100 t) capacity in 1976. Steel with steel siding, the only factory that wasn't steel-and-brick, and only factory that wasn't built prior to 1927; built for $14 million.
- Fremont, Ohio, built 1900, 3,500 short tons (3,200 t) capacity in 1976. Expansion to handle sugar cane was planned in 1978.
- Missoula, Montana built in 1916, 1,000 short tons (910 t) capacity in 1919. Operated for one year due to disputes; Amalgamated built a replacement plant on its site in 1928.
- Findlay, Ohio built in 1911, 1,500 short tons (1,400 t) capacity in 1976.
- Montreal, Canada (probable)

== Other operations ==
- Horse Creek, Wyoming, lime quarry, 1908.
- Ingleside, Colorado, lime quarry, 1908.
- Fort Collins, Colorado, experimental station and research farms.

== Great Western Food ==
The White Lily flour mill, opened in 1884 by J. Allen Smith in Knoxville, Tennessee. It was owned by Colorado Milling & Elevator when White took over. They then became part of Great Western Foods (GWF), a division of Great Western United, in 1968. GWF was based in Knoxville, and by 1972 had 6% of the southeast's regional flour milling capacity. It also produced its Three Rivers brand cornmeal.

Federal Company and its subsidiary Dixie Portland Flour Mills purchased GWF in 1972. As Federal had 11% of the flour market, a Justice Department assistant district attorney in the antitrust division, Thomas E. Kauper, filed suit to require the divestment of GWF. The Justice Department lost that suit, as there was no basis for a regional market to the exclusion of others. Further, Federal's "home flour" market was fragmented between about 50 private-label and non-premium brands, and was also in a steep sales decline from 1965 to 1974. Federal/Dixie-Portland then renovated the plant in 1975. White Lily was the fourth most popular brand of flour in the US in 1988.

The White Lily mill, after GWF and then Dixie Portland/Federal, went through many ownership changes from 1989 on: Holly Farms, Tyson Foods, Archer-Daniels-Midland, Windmill Holdings, then C.H. Guenther & Son Inc.'s Pioneer Flour Mills in 1995. Guenther used the site as a copacker for The J.M. Smucker Company; Smucker bought the White Lily brand in 2006, and Guenther closed the mill in 2008. The mill site was purchased by developer David Dewhirst in 2011, planning to turn part of it into lofts.

== Shakey's Pizza ==
White purchased half of Shakey's Pizza in early 1967 through Colorado Milling, buying out Sherwood "Shakey" Johnson's half of the company, and then Great Western bought out Ed Plummer's remaining half of the company later in the year. There were 400 restaurants (of which 42 were company-owned) in 1971, and 530 (89 company-owned) in 1976. Shakey's franchisees settled a lawsuit with Great Western in April 1970 over (illegal) requirements to purchase ingredients from Great Western. The corporate headquarters was in Eagleton, Colorado. Joseph F. Dolan was president and CEO of Shakey's for some time until his resignation in February 1974.

Hunt International Resources bought Great Western, including Shakey's, in 1974. Investors Gary Brown and Jay Halverson purchased it in 1984, then sold it to Singapore-based Inno-Pacific Holdings in 1988 (foreign locations) and 1989 (domestic).

== Great Western Restaurant Company ==
The company started a steakhouse chain, named Prime Time Restaurants in 1969 and called The Great Western Restaurant Company in the 1970s. It was incorporated in Delaware and inactive by 1976.

== Great Western Cities ==
Mendelsohn started the 119,000 acres (48,000 ha) California City, California in 1958, and added the 9,900 acres (4,000 ha) Colorado City, Colorado development in 1962. After negotiating a 99 year lease with the Cochiti tribe, he added the 6,200 acres (2,500 ha) Cochiti City, New Mexico development in 1969.

The California City land was acquired without mineral rights, meaning titles sold to customers were not fee simple, with 29,072 acres (11,765 ha) of mineral rights held by the state, primarily in the Second Community section. The U.S. Borax Company applied to prospect on 5,760 acres (2,330 ha) of that land in 1966. This means the surface land could be at risk of being disrupted for the mining process, even used as part of an open pit mine. Through an agreement with California Department of Real Estate, Great Western Cities was effectively stopped from selling any of that 29,072 acres (11,765 ha) land base.

Tom Maney was the vice-president and general counsel for Great Western Cities (GWC) in 1975.

Mendelsohn owned California City Development Company until it merged into GWU in 1969; he was then elected to GWU's board. In that same year Barron's described California City as "more suited to blizzards than people". Mendelsohn was fired by White in 1970, though he remained a large shareholder, and led criticism against White until he was removed a year later. Mendelsohn also owned North American Towns, Inc. and California City Realty Co. In addition to California and federal investigations, sales at Great Western Cities declined from almost $25 million in 1970 to $13 million in 1971. In 1971, the National Indian Youth Council sued over the agreement, stating lease terms weren't adequately explained, and the water rights guarantees were illegal. Bureau of Indian Affairs attorney William Veeder described it a "dereliction of duty". GWU agreed with the courts to not use the Cochiti water rights until matters were settled, and instead began purchasing water rights from ranchers in the surrounding area.

Great Western Cities completed the California City Inn in June 1971. It had 105 guest rooms plus restaurants and convention faciltieies. They also built The Greenhorn Inn motel in Colorado City, with 60 rooms and facilities.

Tom Watson was the CEO of Great Western Cities by 1971. Norman Gross, who had been at GWC and predecessors since 1958, was EVP and GM of GWC by late 1972, having rejoined after a brief absence.

GWC was encumbered by the 1972 FTC settlement and by the Interstate Land Sales Full Disclosure Act of 1968, which combined to give buyers some recourse and forced additional disclosure from GWC. By 1972 regulations banning developments with septic tanks, which meant some lots could not be sold. By early 1974 it was clear the FTC was dissatisfied by their compliance with the order, and in 1975 they itemized many violation in the 1972-1974 time period. They reached a settlement in 1975, requiring $4 million in refunds to a class of customers and required $16 million investment in infrastructure projects at the three locations.

Further, in March 1973, GWC settled with the California Department of Real Estate commissioner and the Attorney General, agreeing to an injunction. GWC then settled with the state in 1980 to get a clear title to the land encumbered with mining rights. This settlement meant the state relinquished their surface entry rights to the minerals (to 500 feet (150 m) depth), but did not remove the state's actual mineral rights, on the encumbered land. In exchange, GWC deeded a section (640 acres (260 ha)) to the BLM for the Desert Tortoise Natural Area, deeded another section of 640 acres back to the State Lands Commission, and received clear title on the remaining approx 12,200 acres (4,900 ha) of Second Community. Clearing the rights in the Third Community part of California City were left to a future agreement.

In a 1976 filing, the company reported $20.2 million in revenues but posted a loss of $11.1 million in 1973, $18.5 million revenue and $6.4 million loss in 1974, $15.8 million revenue and $$12.6 million loss in 1975, and $14 million revenue and $3.2 million profit in 1976. The commission structure was described as being 6-15% of the price for salaried sales staff and typically 50% to independent sales representatives, with the amounts being frontloaded; an independent salesperson would receive 90% of the down payment and 75% of monthly payments until their commission amount was reached. Great Western salespeople only sold virgin land; resales were described as having "limited markets" and said "management believes that such resales are made at prices substantially lower to Great Western Cities' current offering prices."

In the same 1976 filing, GWU wrote down $4.3 million from GWC in 1975 and reserved $4 million for the FTC settlement. The company strongly indicated they had been wanting to dispose of GWC since 1975, citing "adverse publicity concerning land developers" among other issues. The main sales office was 14,000 square feet (1,300 m^{2}) in North Hollywood, California.

Subsidiaries of the company in 1976 were the following, incorporated in their own state unless otherwise specified:

- California City Development Company
  - GWU Properties, Inc.
  - Boron Valley Water Development Company; inactive by 1976
  - California City Realty Company
  - Western Cities Hotels (incorporated in Delaware)
- Colorado City Development Company
  - Colorado City Realty Company
  - Great Western Cities Realty Company
- Great Western Cities, Inc. of New Mexico
  - Great Western Cities Realty (incorporated in California; inactive by 1976)

In 1980 the CEO was Charles W. Terrell.

== Western Investment Company ==
After the Hunt acquisition in 1974, the Hunt brothers added a commodity futures and precious metals division called the Western Investment Company, based at the First National office in Dallas. Commodity futures trading was responsible for $17 million in pretax profits in the 1975 fiscal year.

In 1977 Hunt, through Great Western, acquired the Sunshine Mine, an Idaho silver mine.

Related subsidiaries of the company in 1976 were the following:

- Western Bullion Corporation (incorporated in Delaware)
- Western Investment Company (incorporated in Delaware)

== Impel Corporation ==
Also following the 1974 Hunt acquisition, the brothers added oil and gas exploration and development in the Rocky Mountains under Impel Corporation (renamed from Great Western Energy Corporation in April 1975). They were based in Denver. Coal and natural gas costs were a significant input, and risk, to the sugar business, especially following the 1973 oil crisis.

Subsidiaries of the company in 1976 were the following, incorporated in Delaware:

- Impel Corporation
  - Western Energy Coal Company; inactive by 1976
  - Western Energy Land Company; inactive by 1976
  - Impel New Zealand, Ltd.
  - Knott Land Company; inactive by 1976
  - Energy Equipment Company; inactive by 1976
  - Carver Tipple Corporation; inactive by 1976
  - Oakdale Tipple Corporation; inactive by 1976

== See also ==
- Fanjul family
