= Spectrum S-40 Freedom =

American very light business jet (in development 2016)

S-40 Freedom

General information
- Type: Very light jet (VLJ), personal business jet
- National origin: United States
- Manufacturer: Spectrum Aeronautical

History
- Developed from: Spectrum S-33 Independence

The Spectrum S-40 Freedom is a business jet under development by Spectrum Aeronautical. The aircraft was announced at the 2006 NBAA Conference in Orlando, Florida.

== Design and development ==
The S-40 is expected to be classified as a very light jet, albeit it is planned to feature a cabin comparable to the Lear 60, Hawker 800, Phenom 300 and the Citation XLS, at a Maximum Take-Off Weight of less than 10,000 lb (4,500 kg).

It will be built using a graphite-epoxy construction process that makes the aircraft one third the weight of comparably sized aluminium airplanes. The aircraft is designed to cruise at 45,000 ft (14,000 m) at speeds up to 435 knots (Mach 0.76) and fly as far as 4170 km - while consuming about 40% less fuel than conventionally built planes - using two GE Honda HF120 engines.

The retail sales price of the aircraft is supposed to be US-$6.8 million. In May 2011 Spectrum president Austin Blue is quoted: "We are still trying to get the programmes advancing, but it is not easy" The aircraft is to be released about 12 months before the smaller Spectrum S-33 Independence. FAA and JAA Type Certifications of the S-40 Freedom were initially estimated for 2010.

In 2016, the company stated that it was looking for funding to produce the S-40 in Mexico.

== Specifications ==
General characteristics

- Crew: one, pilot
- Capacity: 7-9 passengers
- Length: 53 ft 10 in (16.4 m)
- Wingspan: 45 ft 6 in (13.9 m)
- Height: 11 ft 8 in (3.6 m)
- Max takeoff weight: 9,550 lb (4,336 kg)
- Interior Height: 6 ft 0 in (1.8 m)
- Interior Width: 6 ft 0 in (1.8 m)
- Interior Length (Cabin Divider to PB): 16 ft 0 in (4.9 m)
- Interior Length (Total; PB to PB): 21 ft 2 in (6.45 m)
- Powerplant: 2 × GE Honda HF120 turbofan engines, 2,095 lbf (9.32 kN) thrust each

Performance

- Maximum speed: 440 kn (506 mph, 815 km/h)
- Range: 2,200 nmi (2,513 mi, 4,074 km)
- Service ceiling: 45,000 ft (13,725 m)
- Specific Range at LRC (nm/lbs. of fuel): 0.81 nmi (1.50 km)
- Time Between Engine Overhauls: 5,000 hours
- Time to FL450 (MTOW): Less than 20 minutes

== See also ==
Related lists

- List of very light jets
