= Spectrum S-33 Independence =

American small carbon fiber business jet (in development 2012)

S-33 Independence

General information
- Type: Very light jet
- National origin: United States
- Manufacturer: Spectrum Aeronautical
- Status: company now bankrupt
- Number built: 1

History
- First flight: Jan 7, 2006

The Spectrum S-33 Independence was a very light jet prototype designed and built by Spectrum Aeronautical using a carbon fiber construction process that makes the airplane weigh about two-thirds as much as a comparably sized aluminum-frame airplane.

The aircraft was designed to cruise at 45,000 ft. at speeds up to 415 knots (Mach 0.72) and fly as far as 2000 nm (3700 km) while using about half the fuel of comparably sized aluminum-framed business aircraft. FAA and JAA Type Certifications of the S-33 Independence were expected to be completed in 2009, but were not. The company has provided no press releases to explain the long delay in gaining certification.

The aircraft was reported to be able to accommodate 5–6 passenger seats, a full-sized private lavatory, and will have a maximum take-off weight of 7,300 lb., with a range of over 2,000 miles.

The retail sales price of the aircraft, which is equipped with Williams FJ-33 engines was supposed to be US-$3.95 million. The aircraft was to be released about 12 months after the bigger S-40 "Freedom". In May 2011 Spectrum president Austin Blue said, "We are still trying to get the programs advancing, but it is not easy".

== Accident ==
The only completed S-33, registration N322LA, crashed in a test flight on July 25, 2006 in Spanish Fork, Utah, killing the two test pilots aboard, Glenn Maben and Nathan Forrest. The aircraft rolled right immediately after takeoff, reaching a 90-degree angle before the wingtip struck the ground. The preliminary NTSB report revealed that the control linkage had been connected backward during maintenance after the previous flight, resulting in opposite control output (a left roll input on the control stick resulting in the aircraft rolling right).

== Specifications ==
Data from Jane's All the World's Aircraft 2006–2007

General characteristics

- Crew: 1–2 pilots
- Capacity: 5-8 passengers
- Length: 45 ft 11 in (14.00 m)
- Wingspan: 42 ft 1 in (12.83 m)
- Height: 11 ft 8 in (3.56 m)
- Wing area: 170.0 sq ft (15.79 m^{2})
- Empty weight: 3,620 lb (1,642 kg)
- Max takeoff weight: 7,300 lb (3,311 kg)
- Fuel capacity: 413 US gal (344 imp gal; 1,560 L)
- Powerplant: 2 × Williams FJ33-4A-19 turbofan engines, 1,500 lbf (6.68 kN) thrust each

Performance

- Maximum speed: 415 kn (478 mph, 769 km/h)
- Stall speed: 78 kn (90 mph, 144 km/h) (flaps down)
- Range: 1,600–2,000 nmi (1,830–2,280 mi, 2,960–3,700 km)
- Service ceiling: 45,000 ft (14,000 m) (max certified altitude)

== See also ==
- Spectrum S-40 Freedom
