= Shakey's Pizza =

United States and Philippines pizza chain

Shakey's USA, Inc. (US) Shakey's Pizza Asia Ventures, Inc. (SPAVI) (Philippines & others)
- Logo used in the Philippines since 2013 and in the United States from 2008 to 2025 Logo used in the United States since 2025
- Type: Subsidiary
- Traded as: PSE: PIZZA
- Industry: Restaurants
- Founded: April 30, 1954; 72 years ago Sacramento, California; May 11, 1975; 51 years ago Makati, Philippines
- Founders: Sherwood Johnson; Ed Plummer
- Headquarters: Alhambra, California, U.S. Parañaque, Philippines
- Products: Pizza, sandwiches, pasta, fried chicken, desserts
- Services: Arcade games (Note: Some locations)
- Parent: The Jacmar Companies (US); Century Pacific Group Inc. (63.79%), JE Holdings (14.82%) (Philippines)
- Subsidiaries: Potato Corner
- Website: shakeys.com (US) www.shakeyspizza.ph (Philippines)

Shakey's Pizza is a pizza restaurant chain based in the United States and the Philippines. Founded in 1954, it was the first franchise pizza chain in the United States. In 1968, the chain had 342 locations. As of April 2026, the chain had about 500 stores globally and 43 in the United States. Currently, the stores can be found in the states of California and Washington, as well as in the Philippines, Singapore and Japan.

== History ==
Original Shakey's logo

Shakey's Pizza was founded in Sacramento, California, on April 30, 1954, by Sherwood "Shakey" Johnson and Ed Plummer. Johnson's nickname resulted from nerve damage following a bout of malaria suffered during World War II. The parlor opened on a weekend, but since the pizza ovens were not yet completed, only beer was served. Shakey took the profits from beer sales and bought ingredients for pizza the following Monday.

Shakey personally played Dixieland jazz piano to entertain patrons. He also hired the original members of the Silver Dollar Jazz Band, paying the musicians $10 each plus all the beer and pizza they wanted (Shakey soon realized it was cheaper to pay the musicians scale). This brought the music of Lu Watters to the Sacramento area, causing a local sensation. Jazz historian K.O. Eckland has given the band the credit for the jazz revival in Sacramento that extended to the formation of the Sacramento Traditional Jazz Society. Shakey's also became known outside Sacramento, not for its pizza, but for the jazz program it sponsored on a regional radio network. Shakey Johnson is honored in the American Banjo Museum in Oklahoma City, Oklahoma, for his longtime use of banjo music at his pizza parlors. Other live music, including piano, was also a staple in the old Shakey's parlors. Up until the early 1970s, printed menus included lyrics to classic barbershop songs so that the customers could sing along with the band while their meals were being prepared.

The original parlor (a remodeled grocery store) at 57th and J Streets in Sacramento remained in business until the mid-1990s. The second Shakey's Pizza Parlor opened in Portland, Oregon, in 1956. Shakey's opened their third parlor in Albany, Oregon, in 1959, which was the first building Shakey's actually owned and the first building to be built in the distinct building style for which Shakey's is known. It now operates as a used bookstore. According to Johnson, Shakey's Pizza engaged in little market research and made most of its decisions on where to locate stores by going where Kinney Shoes opened stores. By the time Johnson sold his interest in 1967, there were 272 Shakey's Pizza Parlors in the United States. The first international store opened in Winnipeg, Manitoba, Canada, in 1968. By 1975, the company had expanded to the Pacific Rim, including Japan (in 1973) and the Philippines (in 1975).

By the early 1970s, Shakey's had become popular with families and youth sports groups in Southern California. The long rows of picnic tables end-on-end facilitated large groups. Youth sports teams would go to Shakey's after their weekend games, where the kids could eat pizza and have fun, and the parents could drink beer and socialize. In fact, the advertising motto for Shakey's was "We serve fun at Shakey's... also pizza". One of the features of Shakey's was its large windows between the dining hall and the kitchen. One could order pizza and then watch as the dough was prepared, sauce and toppings added, and then pizza slid into the oven. Kids enjoyed watching the process and running to tell their parents when the pizza came out of the oven.

=== Philippines ===
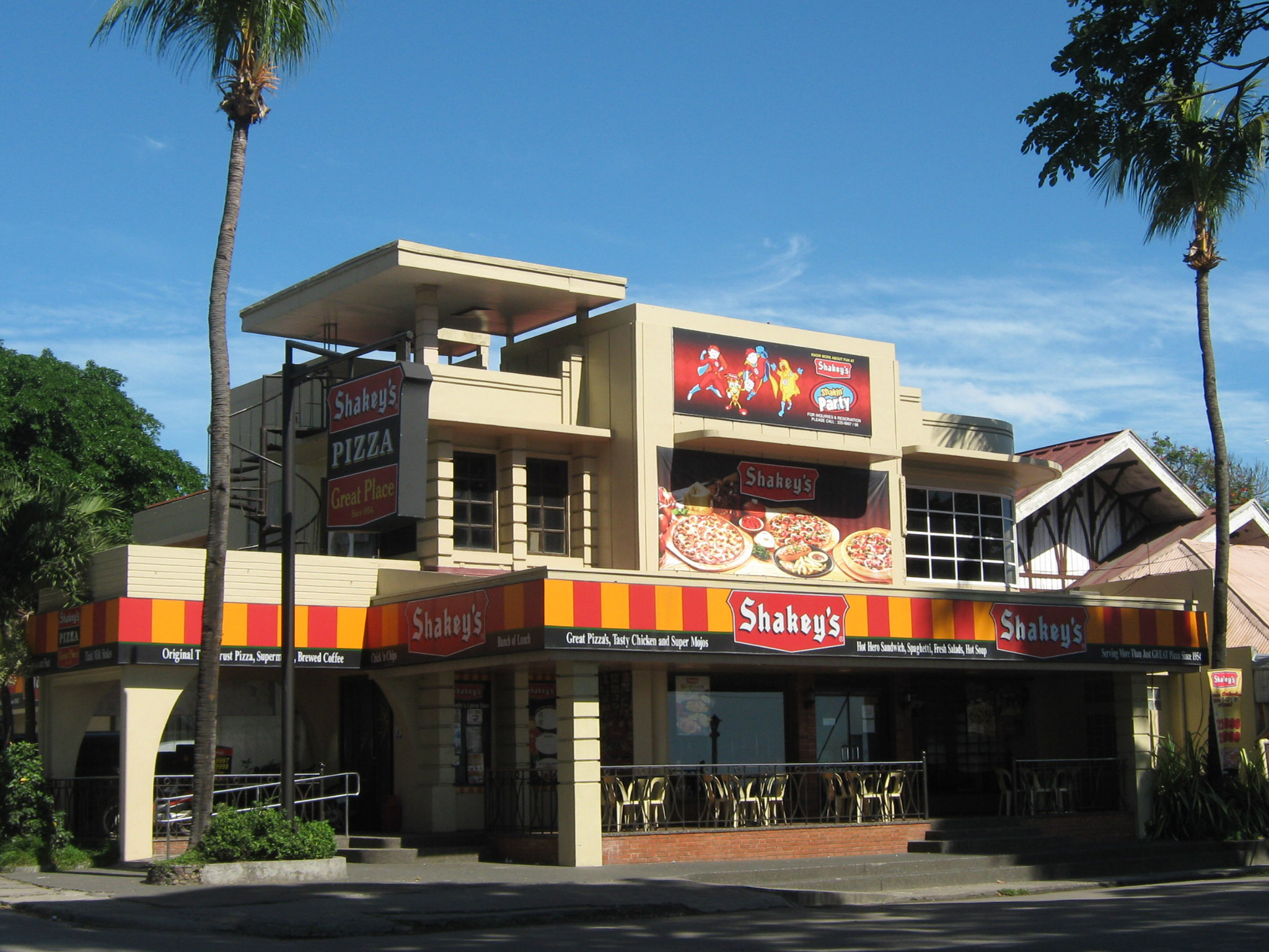
A Shakey's restaurant in Dumaguete, Philippines

The brand became a well-established franchise in the Philippines, where it began in 1975 under the ownership of the country's largest food conglomerate, San Miguel Corporation, primarily promoting their San Miguel draft beer. Beginning with a restaurant located on Makati Avenue in Makati, the restaurant expanded rapidly in Metro Manila, with most of its outlets offering live music. San Miguel had difficulty maintaining the consistency of the branches, and ultimately sold the franchise in 1987 to International Family Food Services, Inc. (IFFSI), a group led by the family of sports executive Leo Prieto.

In 1997, it had evolved into mostly a fast-food franchise. The brand was reengineered as a family-oriented casual dining brand in 2003. In 2004, Shakey's partnered with Sports Vision for the launch of the Shakey's V-League, one of the pioneering volleyball leagues in the country. The Shakey's Super League was formally launched on August 16, 2022, at the Shakey's Pizza Aseana City outlet in Parañaque. This marks the return of Shakey's Pizza in Philippine volleyball since they served as the title sponsor for the Shakey's V-League (now Premier Volleyball League) from 2004 to 2017.

As of early 2015, there were 153 Shakey's outlets in the Philippines, more than double the number remaining in the United States.

In March 2016, the Century Pacific Group and the Singapore-based GIC Private Limited acquired the majority shares of IFFSI from the Prieto family, which will retain a minority interest in the company. In October 2016, IFFSI changed its name to Shakey's Pizza Asia Ventures Inc. (SPAVI) and became listed in the Philippine Stock Exchange on December 15, 2016 with the ticker symbol PSE: PIZZA. It was disclosed that IFFSI acquired ownership of the Shakey's trademark in the Philippines since 1999 and also owns the trademark rights for the Middle East, Asia (except Japan and Malaysia), China, India, Australia and New Zealand. Circa 2017, it signed a joint venture deal to bring the brand to Kuwait.

SPAVI has garnered several recognitions over time. The company ranked in Financial Times' feature on Asia-Pacific's 500 high-growth companies in 2020 and 2021. It was also hailed as the "Philippines' Best Small Cap Company" by Finance Asia in 2018.

=== Ownership changes and decline ===
Shakey Johnson sold his half of the company for $3 million to Colorado Milling and Elevator in 1967, which acquired Plummer's half for $9 million the next year when Colorado Milling merged with Great Western Sugar Company to become Great Western United Corporation.

In 1974, Shakey's was sold from Great Western to Hunt International Resources, famous for their attempt to corner the silver market. At the time Hunt International bought Shakey's in 1974, the restaurant chain had approximately 500 stores throughout the United States, including stores as far east as Latham, New York and Westbrook, Maine. Two franchisees bought the chain in 1984 and they sold out to Inno-Pacific Holdings of Singapore in 1989. By that time, the number of franchises had declined to 221. Most of the remaining U. S. stores closed during the time Inno-Pacific owned the chain. Some of the remaining franchisees took Inno-Pacific to court in 2003. Before the case could come to trial, Shakey's was sold to Jacmar Companies of Alhambra, California in 2004. Jacmar had been the franchisee of 19 Shakey's restaurants. On September 30, 2024, SPAVI announced the incorporation of an American subsidiary that would own and operate and franchise stores in the United States.

As of October 2018, there were 51 Shakey's Pizza restaurants in the United States - 48 of the locations are in California (all, except Oroville, are in Southern California), and two in Washington. The last location east of the Mississippi River, in Auburn, Alabama, closed in April 2019. The location in Renton, Washington closed on January 20, 2025, leaving Pasco as the only remaining Washington location.

All locations closed their dining rooms in mid-March 2020 to combat the COVID-19 pandemic, with take-out service still available. Dining rooms re-opened in May 2021.

== Gallery ==
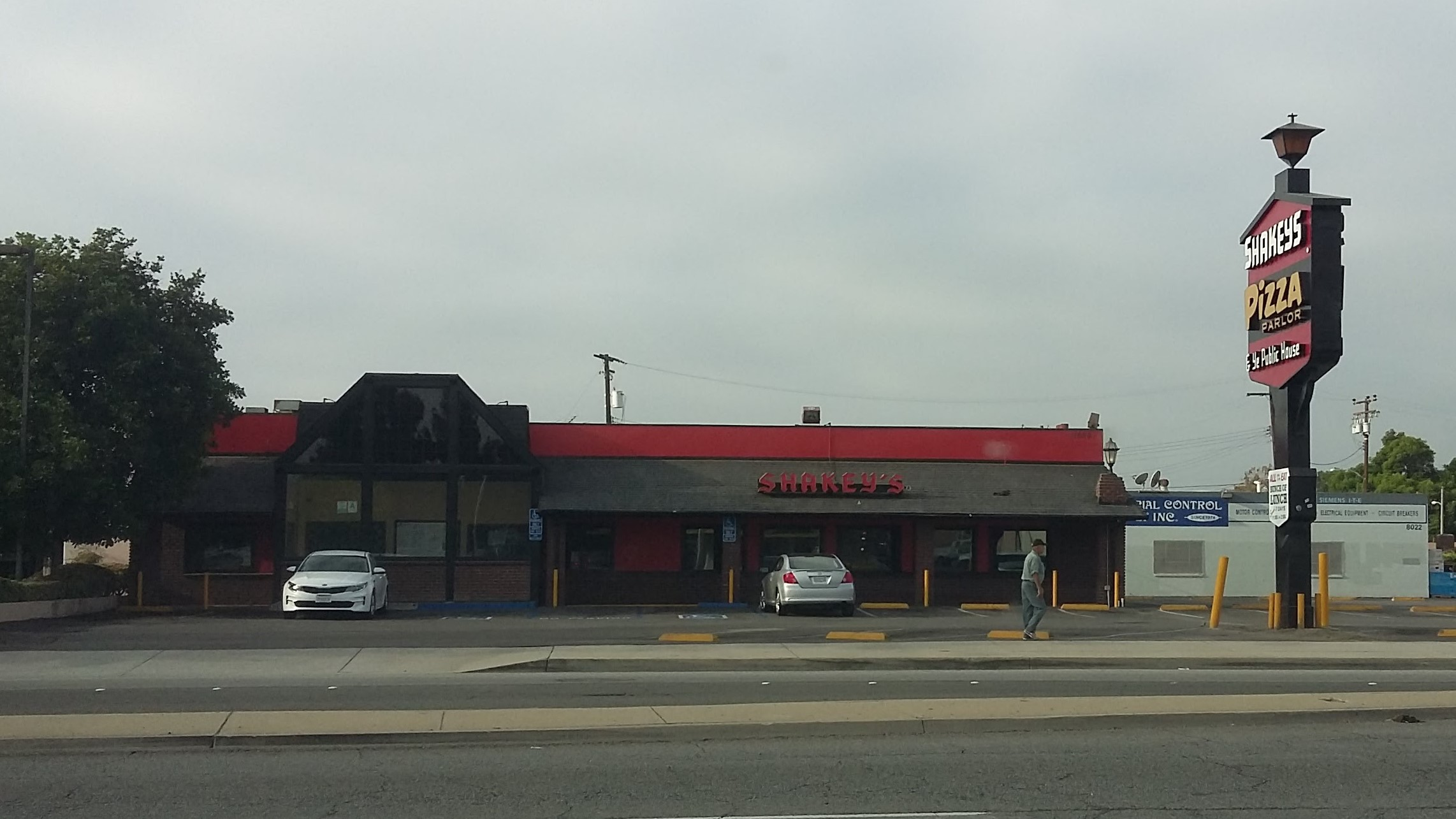
A Shakey's restaurant in Whittier, California

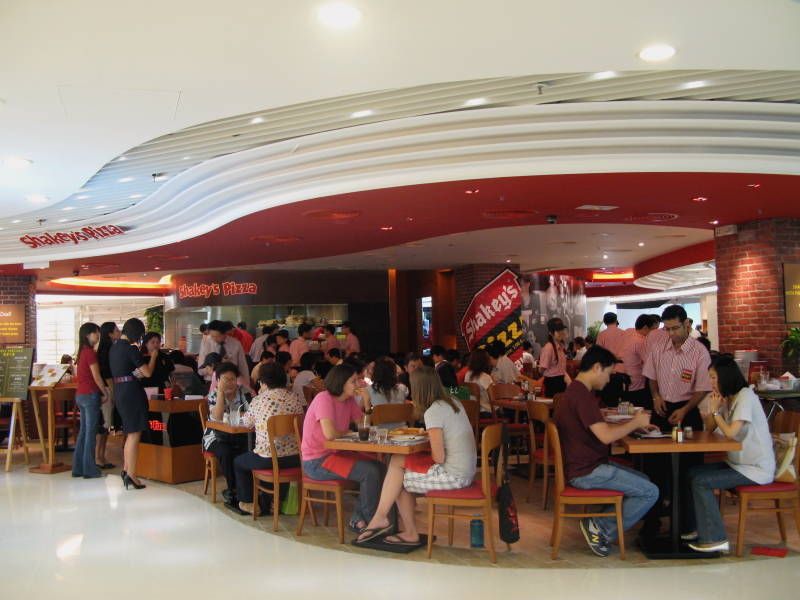
A Shakey's restaurant in Hong Kong

Shakey's had its own "pledge of allegiance" in the early 1970s.

A "Ye Old Notice" sign

== See also ==
- List of pizza chains of the United States
