= General Atomics =

American defense and energy company

- Type: Private
- Industry: Energy, defense, aerospace industry, and technology
- Founded: July 18, 1955; 71 years ago
- Headquarters: San Diego, California, United States 32°53′37″N 117°14′04″W
- Key people: J. Neal Blue; Linden S. Blue
- Products: Unmanned aerial vehicles, SiGA, EM^{2}, EMALS, AAG, Predator, Gray Eagle, Reaper
- Revenue: US$ 3.2 billion (2024)
- Number of employees: 15,000 (2025)
- Divisions: Energy, Electromagnetic Systems
- Subsidiaries: General Atomics Aeronautical Systems, General Atomics Systems Integration, Diazyme, ConverDyn, Cotter, Nuclear Fuels Corporation
- Website: www.ga.com

General Atomics (GA) is an American energy and defense corporation headquartered in San Diego, California, that specializes in research and technology development in the fields of nuclear energy, unmanned aerial vehicles, and other electromagnetic sensors and systems.

This includes physics research in support of nuclear fission and nuclear fusion energy. It is a primary supplier of the US stockpile stewardship program's laser inertial confinement fusion research, including the National Ignition Facility. It also operates DIII-D, the largest active tokamak in the US. It developed and maintains the TRIGA series of nuclear research reactors.

The company provides research and manufacturing services for unmanned combat aerial vehicles, including its MQ-1 Predator, MQ-1C Gray Eagle, MQ-9 Reaper, and MQ-20 Avenger drones. It also provides airborne sensors, and advanced electric, electronic, wireless, and laser technologies, such as the US Navy's Electromagnetic Aircraft Launch System.

== History ==
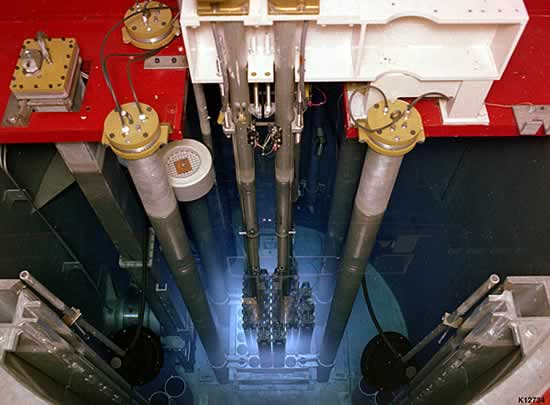
The TRIGA nuclear reactor was one of the first General Atomics projects.

General Atomics was founded on July 18, 1955, in San Diego, California, by Frederic de Hoffmann with assistance from notable physicists Edward Teller and Freeman Dyson. The company was originally part of the General Atomic division of General Dynamics "for harnessing the power of nuclear technologies".

GA's first offices were in the General Dynamics facility on Hancock Street in San Diego. GA also used a schoolhouse on San Diego's Barnard Street as its temporary headquarters, which it would later "adopt" as part of its Education Outreach program. In 1956, San Diego voters approved the transfer of land to GA for permanent facilities in Torrey Pines, and the John Jay Hopkins Laboratory for Pure and Applied Science was formally dedicated there on June 25, 1959. The Torrey Pines facility serves as the company's headquarters today.

General Atomics's initial projects were the TRIGA nuclear research reactor, which was designed to be safe, and Project Orion. GA helped develop and run the San Diego Supercomputer Center.

In 1967, the company was sold to Gulf Oil and renamed "Gulf General Atomic". It was renamed "General Atomic Company" when Royal Dutch Shell Group's Scallop Nuclear Inc. became a 50–50 partner in 1973. When Gulf bought out its partner, it was renamed again to "GA Technologies Incorporated" in 1982. It was taken over by Chevron following its merger with Gulf Oil in 1984. In 1986, it was sold to a company owned by Neal Blue and Linden Blue.

In 1979, Harold Agnew was appointed president and CEO of the company.

In 1987, former US Navy Rear Admiral Thomas J. Cassidy Jr. joined the corporation. In 1993, General Atomics Aeronautical Systems, Inc. (GA-ASI) was created with Neal Blue as Chairman-CEO and Thomas J. Cassidy as president. In 1994, GA-ASI spun off as an affiliate. On March 15, 2010, Rear Adm. Thomas J. Cassidy stepped down as president of GA-ASI's Aircraft Systems Group, staying on as non-executive chairman of the company's management committee. Frank Pace, the executive vice president of Aircraft Systems Group, succeeded Cassidy as President of GA-ASI.

General Atomics is also developing a Generation IV reactor design, the Gas Turbine Modular Helium Reactor (GT-MHR). In 2010, General Atomics presented a new version of the GT-MHR, the Energy Multiplier Module (EM2), which uses fast neutrons and is a Gas-cooled fast reactor.

General Atomics, including its affiliate, General Atomics Aeronautical Systems, is San Diego County's largest defense contractor, according to a September 2013 report by the San Diego Military Affairs Council. The top five contractors, ranked by defense-generated revenue in fiscal year 2013, were General Atomics, followed by Northrop Grumman, General Dynamics-NASSCO, BAE Systems, and Science Applications International Corporation (SAIC). A separate October 2013 report by the San Diego Business Journal ranked contractors by the number of local employees. The top three contractors were General Atomics, Northrop Grumman, and General Dynamics-NASSCO.

In September 2020, a $7.4 billion contract for MQ-9 Reaper drones was announced between the U.S. Air Force and General Atomics. The contract calls for the delivery of up to 36 aircraft per year.

== Leadership ==
General Atomics is led by chairman and CEO Neal Blue and his brother, Linden Blue.

Linden P. Blue is the chief executive officer of General Atomics Aeronautical Systems (GA-ASI), the division responsible for manufacturing and selling the Reaper UAV. Dave R. Alexander is the President of GA-ASI. Scott Forney is the President of General Atomics Electromagnetic Systems (GA-EMS).

== Business groups ==
- Electromagnetic Systems Group
  - The Electromagnetic Systems (EMS) Group is a supplier of electromagnetic systems and related power equipment for a variety of defense, energy, and commercial transportation applications. EMS is a major factor in applying electromagnetic technologies to aircraft launch and recovery (EMALS and AAG System), projectile launch (Navy railgun), and magnetic levitation transportation systems.
  - Nuclear Technology & Materials (NTM)
    - Advanced fission reactor technology
    - Nuclear fuels and medical isotopes
    - Nuclear Materials Science & Engineering
- Energy Group
  - Magnetic Fusion Energy
    - DIII-D National Fusion Facility
    - ITER Central Solenoid
    - Fusion Plasma Theory and Computation
  - Inertial confinement fusion technology

== Affiliated companies ==
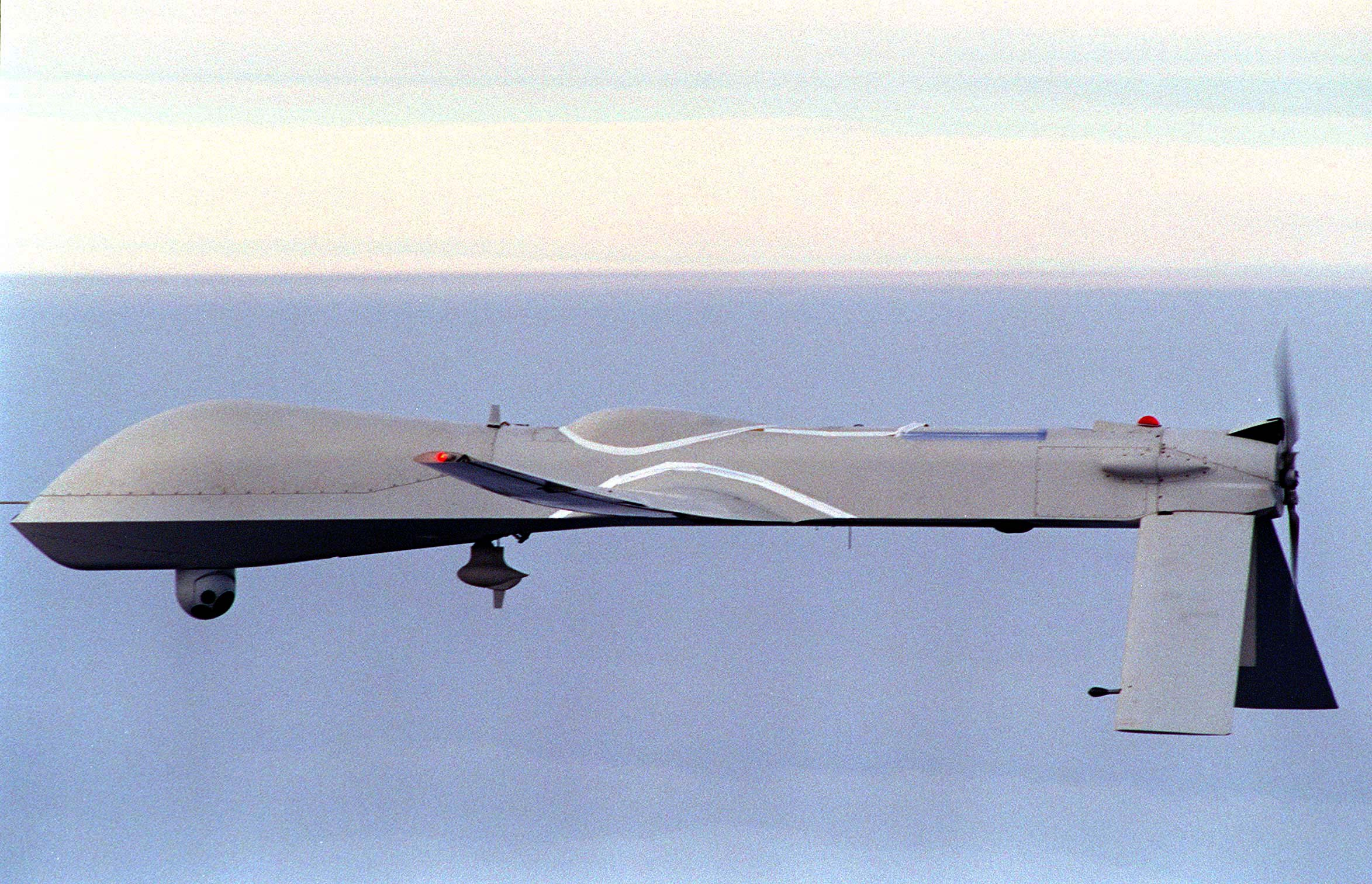
The Predator UAV is made by General Atomics affiliate General Atomics Aeronautical Systems.

- General Atomics Aeronautical Systems, Inc. (GA-ASI) – GA-ASI's Aircraft Systems Group produces the Predator series of remotely piloted aircraft used in the Kosovo, Iraq, and Afghanistan conflicts. GA-ASI's Reconnaissance Systems Group provides tactical reconnaissance radars, and high-resolution surveillance systems for manned and unmanned aircraft.
- General Atomics Electronic Systems, Inc. (GA-ESI) – consists of five product lines involving different aspects of energy.
  - Terminal Automation Products (TAP) provides automated distribution, inventory control and transaction processing systems to bulk product storage facilities that handle petroleum, chemical and agricultural products.
  - Radiation Monitoring Systems (RMS) designs, manufactures, and supports a full range of radiation monitoring, detecting, control, data collection, and display equipment, with equipment and systems at over half of the currently operating nuclear plants in the United States and at numerous sites in Europe and throughout the Far East.
  - General Atomics Energy Products manufactures Maxwell high voltage capacitors after acquiring the product line from Maxwell Technologies in 2000.
  - The Gulftronic Separator System is a continuous operation, electrostatic, on-stream separation system currently in use by most major oil companies. Since their introduction in 1979, over 30 systems have been installed at petroleum refineries worldwide.
  - TRIGA (Training, Research, Isotopes and General Atomics), with over 65 facilities in 22 countries, is a supplier of nuclear research reactors for university, industrial, government, and medical applications. Originally designed to meet requirements for operator training, educational programs including nuclear research, and fuel development, TRIGA's design has allowed its usage to be expanded to meet the requirements of application in medical and agricultural research, isotope production, and neutron radiography.
- General Atomics Systems Integration, LLC (GA-SI) – provider of military and commercial engineering services. GA-SI is active in aircraft systems integration technologies, reliability improvements, and controls system design. GA-SI provides engineering services for new-development and aging-system services to military and commercial customers. The company also provides Test and Evaluation assessment, and field services.
- General Atomics Integrated Intelligence, Inc. (GA-i3) – a data analytics and software engineering company, founded in 1989 and located in Charlottesville, VA. It provides custom software development and innovative information engineering solutions to customers in government and private industry. GA-i3 designs and implements scalable big data solutions to rapidly create activity-based intelligence and information dominance for multi-domain operations.
- ConverDyn – provides uranium hexafluoride (UF_{6}) conversion and related services to utilities operating nuclear power plants in North America, Europe, and Asia. The company coordinates and manages all aspects of the conversion process, including uranium deliveries, uranium sampling, materials storage, and product delivery. Jointly owned by Honeywell Inc.
- Cotter Corporation – headquartered in Denver, Colorado. Through its various mining and milling operations, Cotter has produced uranium, vanadium, molybdenum, silver, lead, zinc, copper, selenium, nickel, cobalt, tungsten, and limestone. Originally incorporated in 1956 in New Mexico as a uranium production company, Cotter was purchased by and became a wholly owned subsidiary of Commonwealth Edison in 1975. GA acquired Cotter in early 2000.
- Heathgate Resources Pty. Ltd. – Formed in 1990, Heathgate Resources is the owner and operator of the Beverley Uranium Mine in northern South Australia. Beverley is Australia's third uranium mine and Australia's only operating In Situ Leach mine.
- Nuclear Fuels Corporation – NFC was formed in 1991, by General Atomics (GA) to market uranium produced from GA mining assets and to develop further uranium projects. NFC is a long-term contract supplier to both US and foreign utilities and actively participates in uranium trading. NFC is the marketing representative for other GA affiliates, Heathgate Resources and Cotter Corporation. The company also has an agreement to purchase all uranium recovered by Wismut GmbH from reclamation of the Königstein mine in eastern Germany.
- Rio Grande Resources Corporation – controls uranium operations and mineral resources acquired by GA from Chevron Resources in 1991. Included in this acquisition were mines in south Texas and New Mexico. In New Mexico, the Mt. Taylor project, a conventional underground mine that contains the largest uranium resource in the United States, is currently on standby.
- TRIGA International (with CERCA, a subsidiary of Areva)
- Spezialtechnik Dresden GmbH – STD partners with General Atomics to market the Predator drone in Germany.

On September 30, 2020, General Atomics bought the Dornier 228 production line in Oberpfaffenhofen, along with the business aviation and helicopter MRO operations of RUAG, pending regulatory approval.

== Educational outreach ==
Since 1992, the General Atomics Science Education Outreach Program, a volunteer effort of GA employees and San Diego science teachers, has worked with Science Coordinators for the San Diego Schools to bring the business and research sides of science into classrooms.

In 1995, the program was expanded, and the General Atomics Sciences Education Foundation [501(c)(3)] was established. Four areas of "core competency" at General Atomics were initially selected to form the basis for the development of its education modules and associated workshops. Scientist and teacher teams wrote these modules.

== Awards ==
- 2013 Neal Blue, CEO of General Atomics, receives the 29th Annual International von Karman Wings Award
- 2008 North American Frost & Sullivan Award for Company of the Year
- 2008 Defense News Top 100, Ranked #57
- Frost & Sullivan 2006 Business Development Strategy Leadership Award, presented for Gains in the Unmanned Aerial Systems Market
- Shephard Press' Unmanned Vehicles 2005 UAV Design Innovation Award, presented for Warrior Extended Range/Multi-Purpose UAV.
- Aviation Week 2005 Employer of Choice Finalist, Diversity, Valuing People, Technological Challenge – Third Best US Aerospace/Defense Employer
- USAF Association 2004 John R. Alison Award for the most outstanding contributions to national defense by an industrial leader, presented to President/CEO, Thomas J. Cassidy Jr.
- AUVSI's 2002 Pioneer Award, presented to President/CEO Thomas J. Cassidy Jr.
- USAF's 2001 Packard Award for Development & Engineering, presented for Predator/Hellfire Integration
- 1993 Information Services portion of the NSF contract for InterNIC and Internet Scout Report.

== Government influence ==
The Center for Responsible Politics reported General Atomics had spent over $1.5 million per year in lobbying efforts from 2005 to 2011.

In April 2002, the company paid for Letitia White, who was then a top aide to Representative Jerry Lewis, and her husband to travel to Italy. White left Lewis' office nine months later, to become a lobbyist at Copeland Lowery. The next day, she began representing General Atomics. Lewis, her former boss, was at the time chairman of the House Defense Appropriations subcommittee.

== See also ==
- List of nuclear fusion companies
- DIII-D (tokamak)
- High-temperature gas-cooled reactor (HTGR)
- Sequoyah Fuels Corporation
- Victorville Army Airfield auxiliary fields, including the General Atomics Mirage site and the General Atomics Grey Butte site

== Bibliography ==
- "Patents assigned to General Atomics". US Patent & Trademark Office.
- "Affiliates". General Atomics.
