= National Register of Historic Places listings in Rio Blanco County, Colorado =

Location of Rio Blanco County in Colorado

This is a list of the National Register of Historic Places listings in Rio Blanco County, Colorado.

This is intended to be a complete list of the properties and districts on the National Register of Historic Places in Rio Blanco County, Colorado, United States. The locations of National Register properties and districts for which the latitude and longitude coordinates are included below, may be seen in a map.

There are 13 properties and districts listed on the National Register in the county. Another two properties were once listed but have been removed.

This National Park Service list is complete through NPS recent listings posted March 21, 2025.

== Current listings ==
	Name on the Register	Image	Date listed	Location	City or town	Description
1	Battle of Milk River Site	Battle of Milk River Site	August 22, 1975 (#75000536)	Address Restricted	Meeker	Site of the Battle of Milk Creek
2	Canon Pintado	Canon Pintado	October 6, 1975 (#75000538)	Address Restricted	Rangely	
3	Carrot Men Pictograph Site	Carrot Men Pictograph Site	August 22, 1975 (#75000539)	Address Restricted	Rangely	
4	Coal Creek School	Coal Creek School	July 18, 2014 (#14000421)	617 County Road 6; 40°01′52″N 107°49′02″W	Meeker	
5	Collage Shelter Site	Collage Shelter Site	August 27, 1980 (#80000924)	Address Restricted	Rangely	
6	Duck Creek Wickiup Village		November 20, 1975 (#75000537)	Address Restricted	Meeker	
7	Fremont Lookout Fortification Site	Fremont Lookout Fortification Site	November 20, 1974 (#74000593)	Address Restricted	Rangely	
8	Hay's Ranch Bridge	Hay's Ranch Bridge	February 4, 1985 (#85000233)	County Road 127; 40°00′48″N 108°05′32″W	Meeker	
9	Meeker Historic District	Meeker Historic District	January 28, 2019 (#100003359)	Main, 4th, 5th, 6th, 7th & 8th Streets; 40°02′15″N 107°54′47″W	Meeker	
10	Hotel Meeker	Hotel Meeker	May 7, 1980 (#80000923)	560 Main St. 40°02′14″N 107°54′45″W	Meeker	
11	Meeker I.O.O.F. Lodge-Valentine Lodge No. 47	Meeker I.O.O.F. Lodge-Valentine Lodge No. 47	March 19, 2014 (#14000060)	400 Main St. 40°02′15″N 107°54′40″W	Meeker	
12	Pyramid Guard Station	Pyramid Guard Station	January 10, 2008 (#07001354)	County Road 8; 40°09′10″N 107°13′26″W	Yampa	
13	St. James Episcopal Church	St. James Episcopal Church	March 30, 1978 (#78000883)	368 4th St. 40°02′19″N 107°54′37″W	Meeker	

== Former listings ==
	Name on the Register	Image	Date listed	Date removed	Location	City or town	Description
1	Whiskey Creek Trestle	Whiskey Creek Trestle	April 22, 1980 (#80000925)	November 25, 1987	West of Rangely	Rangely	Relocated to Cross Land and Fruit Company Orchards and Ranch Historic Site in Grand Junction, Colorado in 1987.

== See also ==
- List of National Historic Landmarks in Colorado
- List of National Register of Historic Places in Colorado
- Bibliography of Colorado
- Geography of Colorado
- History of Colorado
- Index of Colorado-related articles
- List of Colorado-related lists
- Outline of Colorado
