= Kokopelli =

Fertility deity venerated by some Native American cultures

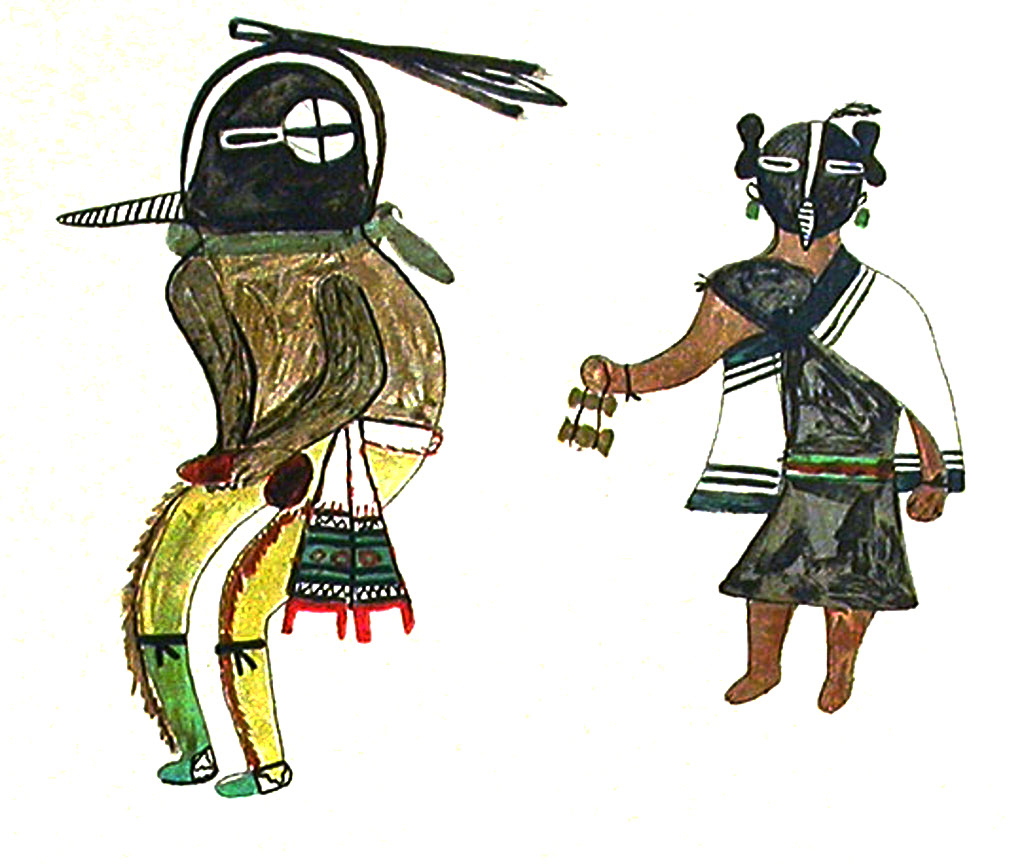
Kokopelli and Kokopelli Mana as depicted by the Hopi

Kokopelli (/ˌkoʊkoʊˈpɛliː/) is a fertility deity, usually depicted as a humpbacked flute player (often with feathers or antenna-like protrusions on his head), who is venerated by some Native American cultures in the Southwestern United States. Like most fertility deities, Kokopelli presides over both childbirth and agriculture. He is also a trickster god and represents the spirit of music.

== Myths ==
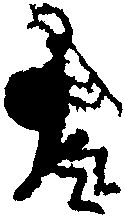
A phallic Kokopelli

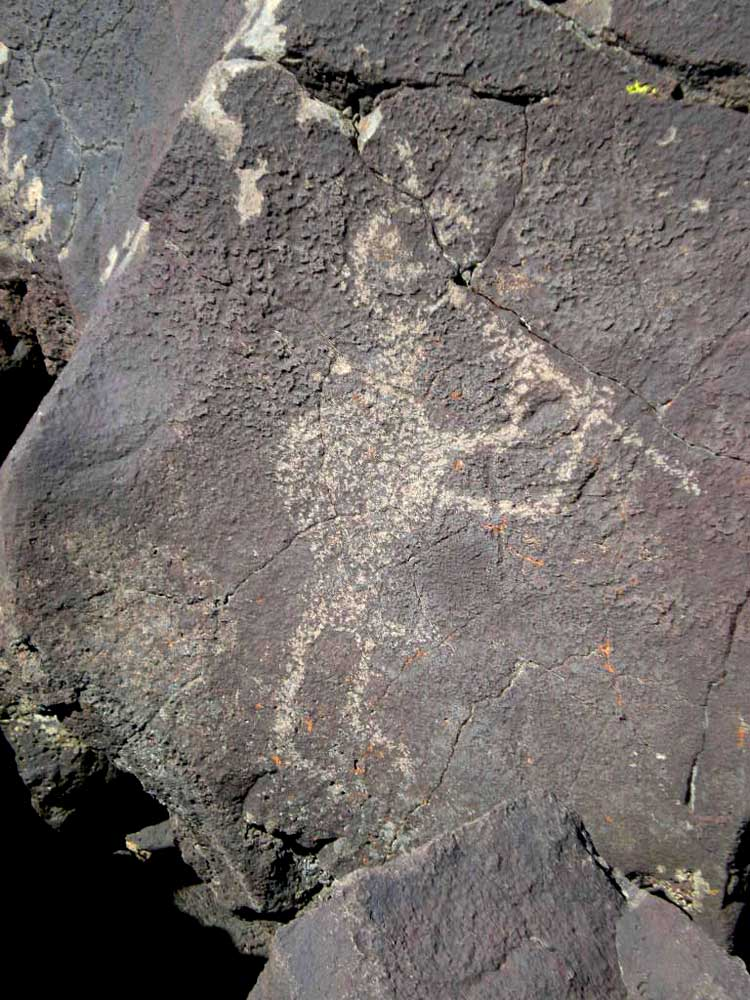
Kokopelli petroglyph located on land near Embudo, New Mexico

Among the Hopi, Kokopelli carries unborn children on his back and distributes them to women; for this reason, young girls often fear him. He often takes part in rituals relating to marriage, and Kokopelli himself is sometimes depicted with a consort, a woman called Kokopelmimi by the Hopi. It is said that Kokopelli can be seen on the full and waning moon, much like the "man" or the "rabbit" on the moon.

Kokopelli also presides over the reproduction of game animals, and for this reason, he is often depicted with animal companions such as rams and deer. Other common creatures associated with him include sun-bathing animals such as snakes, or water-loving animals such as lizards and insects.

In his domain over agriculture, Kokopelli's flute-playing chases away the winter and brings about spring. Many tribes, such as the Zuni, also associate Kokopelli with the rains. He frequently appears with Paiyatamu, another flutist, in depictions of maize-grinding ceremonies. Some tribes say he carries seeds and babies on his back.

In recent years, the emasculated (i.e. non-ithyphallic) version of Kokopelli has been adopted as a broader symbol of the Southwestern United States as a whole. His image adorns countless items such as t-shirts, ball caps, key-chains, and patio decor. He is also noticeable on the wall by the swimming pool on the home of Walter White (Bryan Cranston) in several episodes of Breaking Bad. A bicycle trail between Grand Junction, Colorado, and Moab, Utah, is now known as the Kokopelli Trail.

== Origins and development ==
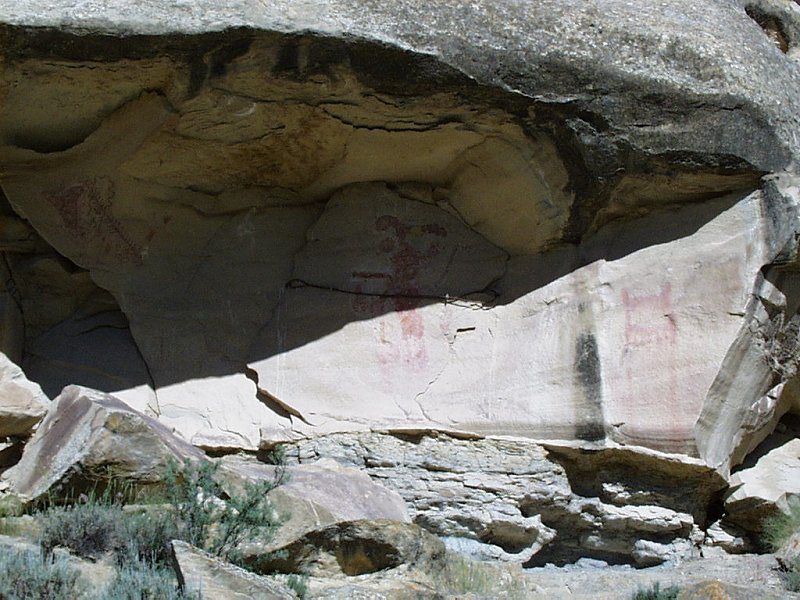
Kokopelli pictograph "Cañon Pintado", ca. 850–1100 AD, Rio Blanco County, Colorado

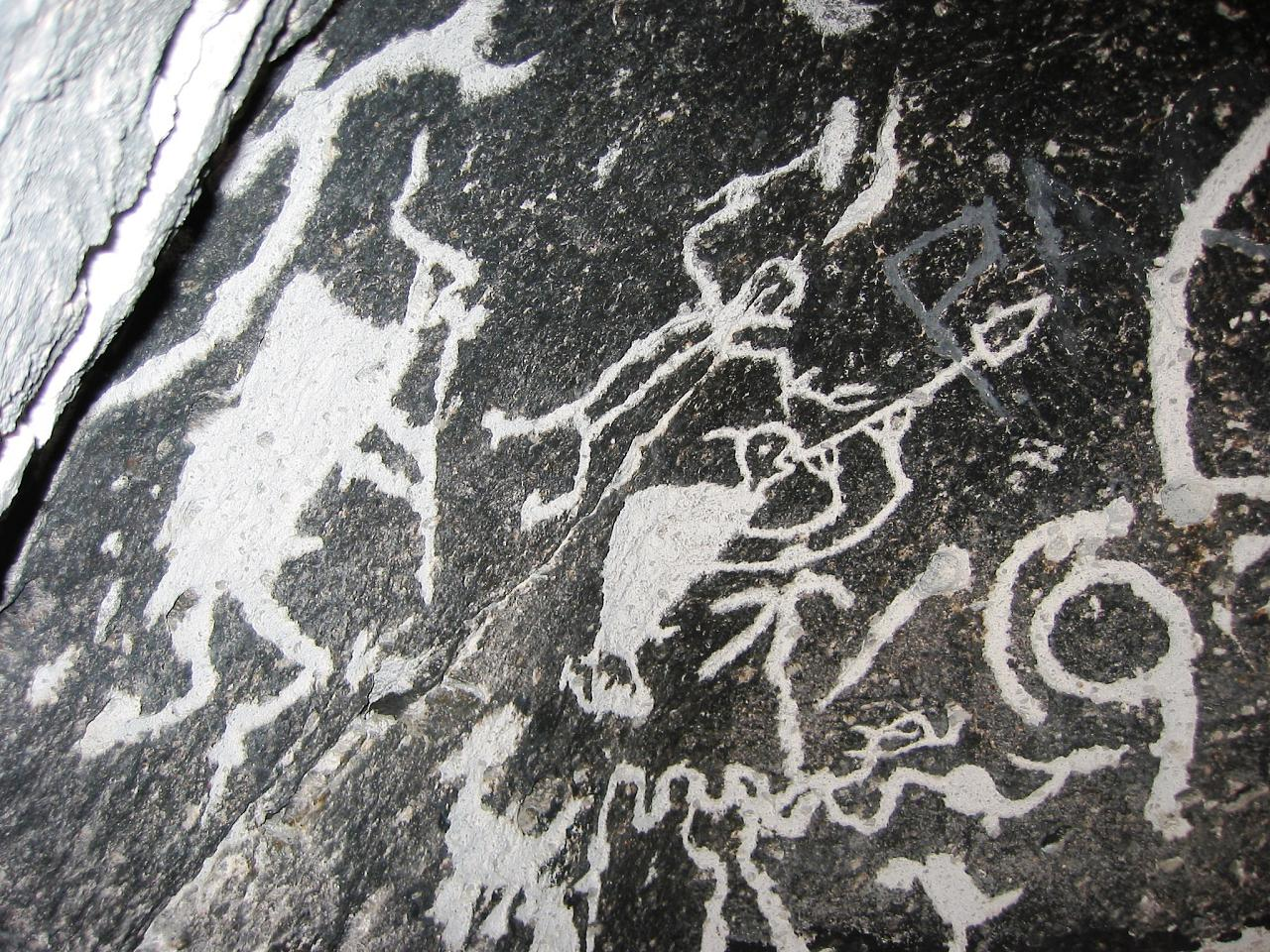
Petroglyph of Kokopelli in the "Rio Grande Style" of the ancestral Pueblo culture after the year 1300; taken at Mortendad Cave near Los Alamos, NM

Kokopelli has been revered since at least the time of the Hohokam, Quechan, and Ancestral Puebloans. The first known images of him appear on Hohokam pottery dated to sometime between 750 and 850.

Kokopelli may originally have been a representation of pochtecas, Aztec traders, who travelled to this region from northern Mesoamerica. These traders brought their goods in sacks slung across their backs, and this sack may have evolved into Kokopelli's familiar hump; some tribes consider Kokopelli a trader. These men may also have used flutes to announce their friendly intentions as they approached a settlement. This origin is still in doubt, however, since the first known images of Kokopelli predate the major era of Mesoamerican-Ancestral Pueblo peoples trade by several hundred years, as well as the Aztec Empire and its pochtecas.

As portrayed in the folklore of southwestern indigenous culture, the character of Kokopelli is viewed as an embodiment of the ancient wandering traders who used to communicate news and goods from one place to another. In this context, his noisy arrival and musical performances were meant to convey that he was a harmless being, just like Ekeko in Andes folklore, who would bring goods and amusement.

Even today, occasional outside visitors may be called 'Kokopelli' when they bring news, stories, and trinkets from the outside world to share with the little pueblos or villages.

Another theory is that Kokopelli is actually an anthropomorphic insect. Many of the earliest depictions of Kokopelli make him appear very insect-like. The name Kokopelli may be a combination of Koko, another Hopi and Zuni deity, and pelli, the Hopi and Zuni word for the robber fly, an insect with a prominent proboscis and a prominently rounded back. A more recent etymology is that Kokopelli means literally "kachina hump". Because the Hopi were the tribe from whom the Spanish explorers first learned of the god, their name is the one most commonly used.

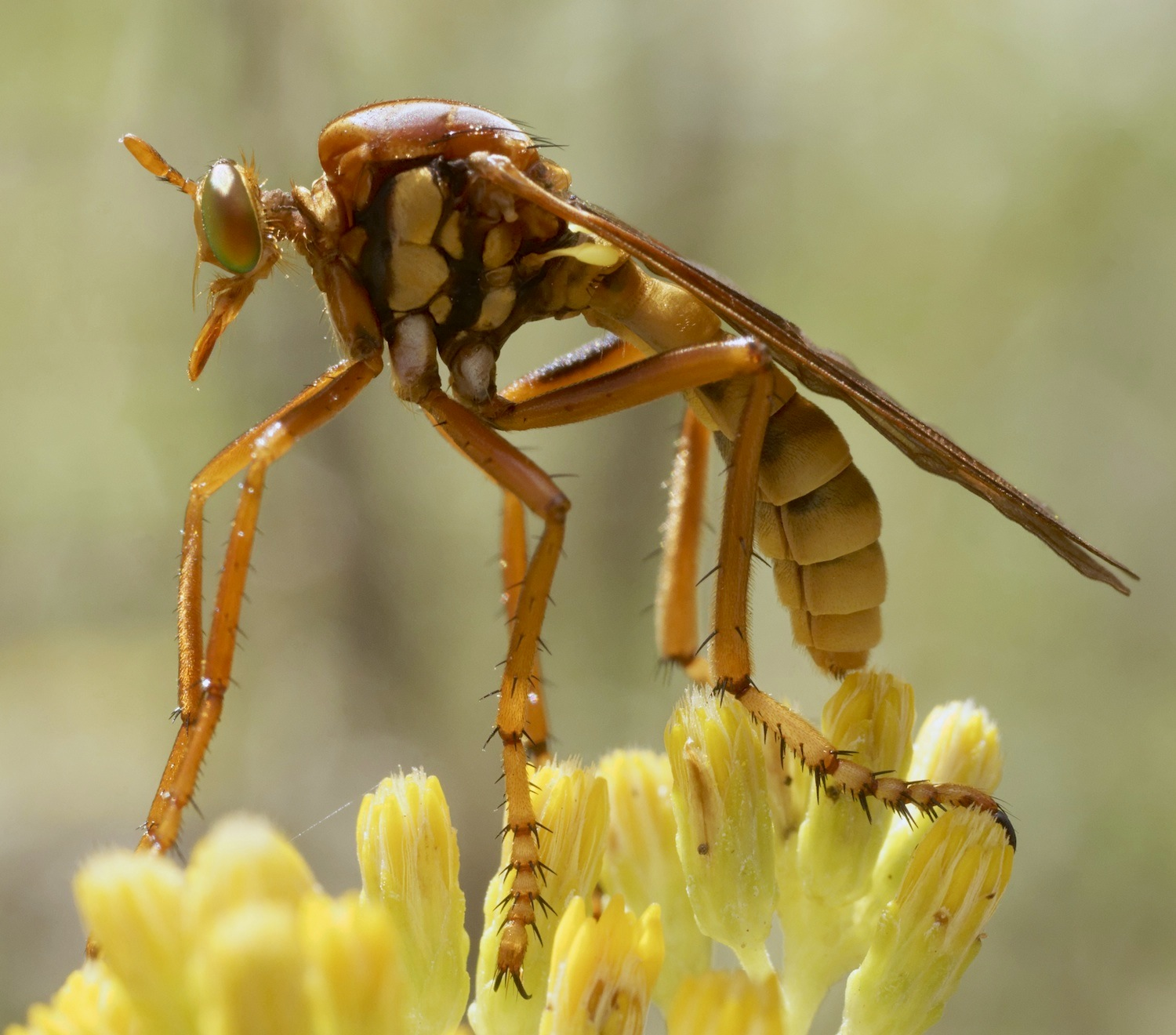
Blepharepium sonorensis, a desert robber fly, an insect theorized as possibly associated with Kokopelli

Kokopelli is one of the most easily recognized figures found in the petroglyphs and pictographs of the Southwest. The earliest known petroglyph of the figure dates to about 1000 AD. The Spanish missionaries in the area convinced the Hopi craftsmen to usually omit the phallus from their representations of the figure. As with most kachinas, the Hopi Kokopelli was often represented by a human dancer.

A similar humpbacked figure is found in artifacts of the Mississippian culture of the United States southeast. Between approximately 1200 to 1400, water vessels were crafted in the shape of a humpbacked woman. These forms may represent a cultural heroine or founding ancestor, and may also reflect concepts related to the life-giving blessings of water and fertility.

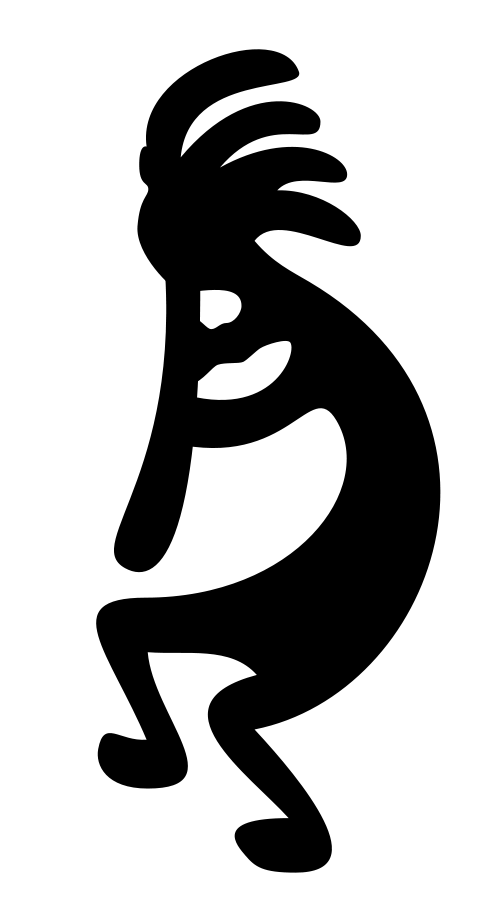
A modern, commercialized Kokopelli figure

== Other names ==
- Kokopele
- Kokopeli
- Kokopilli
- Kokopilau
- Neopkwai'i (Pueblo)
- Ololowishkya (Zuni)
- La Kokopel

== See also ==
- Anasazi flute
- Blythe Intaglios
- Cañon Pintado
- Rock art
- Kokopelli (album)
