= Cañon Pintado =

Archaeological site in Colorado, United States

- U.S. National Register of Historic Places
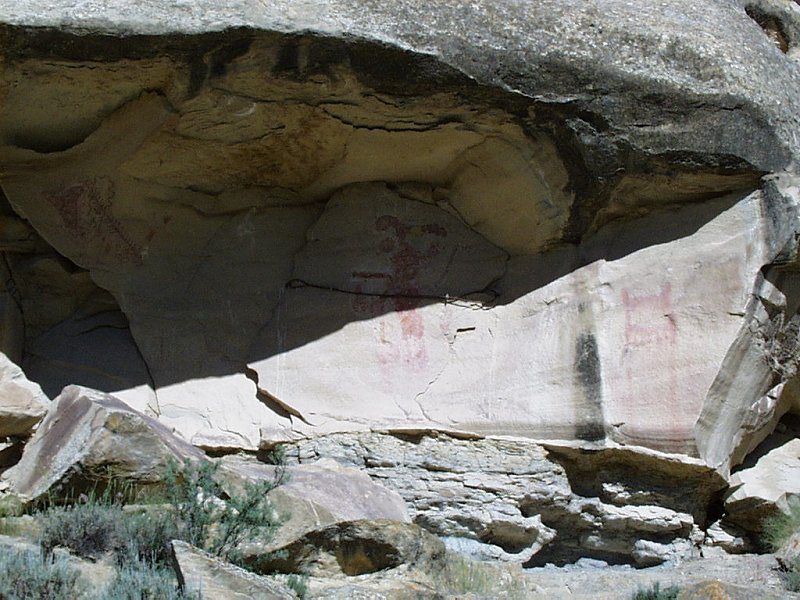
- Kokopelli, a flute-playing figure common in the Ancestral Puebloan art of the Southwest, at Cañon Pintado about 850-1100 AD
- Nearest city: Rangely
- NRHP reference No.: 75000538
- Added to NRHP: 1975

Cañon Pintado 'painted canyon' is an archaeological site of Native American rock art located in the East Four Mile Draw, 10.5 miles (16.9 km) south of Rangely in Rio Blanco County, Colorado. Led by Ute guides, the Domínguez–Escalante expedition, Spanish missionaries in search of a route to California in 1776, passed through this region as they moved north and then west into Utah. The first Europeans to the area, they named it Cañon Pintado, meaning "painted canyon".

== Rock art ==
The rock art was probably made by people of the Fremont culture (about AD 650–1150) and the Ute (about AD 1200–1881). No one has been able to positively identify the significance of the paintings, however, they were probably made to mark significant events or for religious purposes. The Fremont people were described in a Rangely Museum brochure:

The Fremont people built villages, farmed the valley areas and on high points located watchtowers. In hidden places on the cliffs are still found cisterns and granaries where they stored corn and seeds. Petroglyphs of corn stalks are at a number of these sites. Later the Utes hunted the area and used the valley until they were moved to a reservation in 1881.

There are many easily accessible rock art sites located just south of Rangely along Colorado Highway 139. However, there are thousands of well preserved sites in the immediate area, including numerous sites on County Road 23 and County Road 65.

=== Sun Dagger Site ===
There is evidence that some of the petroglyphs may be of astronomical significance. The markings may indicate the significance winter or summer solstice but more data is required to verify these results.

== Historic places ==
Nearby are the following National Register of Historic Places listings in Rio Blanco County, Colorado, all three are prehistoric Fremont culture sites: Prehistoric sites

- Collage Shelter Site - dated from 500 - 1499 AD.
- Carrot Men Pictograph Site - dated from 500 - 1499 AD.
- Fremont Lookout Fortification Site - dated from 0 - 1499 AD.

== See also ==
- List of prehistoric sites in Colorado
