= Margaret L. Curry =

American parole officer and social worker (1898–1986)

- Born: Margaret L. Taylor; July 16, 1898; Meeker, Colorado, US
- Died: February 14, 1986 (aged 87)
- Education: B.A. music, Colorado State College of Education; M.S. social studies, University of Denver
- Occupation: State parole officer
- Years active: 1952–1970
- Employer: Colorado Department of Corrections
- Spouse: Arthur D. Curry
- Children: 2
- Awards: Colorado Women's Hall of Fame, 1996

Margaret L. Taylor Curry (July 16, 1898 – February 14, 1986) was an American state parole officer, medical social worker, child welfare worker, and music teacher. In 1952 she became the first female parole officer for the Colorado Department of Corrections. During her 18-year tenure, she was the only female officer supervising adult inmates and parolees. She introduced vocational training, high school equivalency courses, and self-improvement classes to further the rehabilitation of women prisoners. She was inducted into the Colorado Women's Hall of Fame in 1996.

== Early life and education ==
Margaret L. Taylor was born on a ranch near Meeker, Colorado. She graduated from high school in Meeker and attended Colorado State College of Education in Greeley, where she earned her bachelor's degree in music.

== Early career ==
After graduation, she began teaching music, piano, and voice in public schools in Greeley, Fort Morgan, and Ault. During the Great Depression, she and her husband moved their family from town to town across the state, looking for jobs. Curry worked for two and a half years in the Department of Public Welfare in Trinidad. The family finally settled in Denver, where the Currys purchased a "cottage camp" (motel) and grocery store.

In 1941, at the age of 43, Curry pursued a master's degree in social studies at the University of Denver. She spent two years as a medical social worker with the American Red Cross, stationed at the Fitzsimons General Hospital, and eight years as a child welfare worker for Arapahoe County.

With the opening of the state's parole department, Curry sat for the civil service examination, receiving the highest grade possible. On July 1, 1952, she was appointed as the first female parole officer for the Colorado Department of Corrections, at a starting salary of $305 per month.

== Parole officer ==
With an average caseload of 42 women, Curry supervised inmates aged 15 to 65 in the Cañon City Penitentiary and the Colorado State Reformatory for Women. These inmates had been convicted of a range of crimes, including embezzlement and murder. Before Curry's arrival, the only work activity afforded to women prisoners was the washing and ironing of the clothes of the male prisoners. Curry introduced vocational training programs staffed by volunteers to teach the women sewing and hairdressing, established high school equivalency courses, and hired a modeling agency to offer self-improvement classes.

She also pushed for women's access to the state's pre-parole center, where soon-to-be released prisoners practiced table etiquette and wearing civilian clothing. After their release, she assisted parolees in finding employment.

During her 18-year tenure, Curry was the only female state parole officer supervising adult inmates and parolees. Among her morale-boosting initiatives was the giving of Christmas stockings filled with small gifts to women prisoners in the Cañon City Penitentiary, and holding a supervised Christmas party at her daughter's house for women incarcerated in the Denver County Jail.

Curry retired in 1970 at the age of 71.

== Honors and awards ==
Curry was inducted into the Colorado Women's Hall of Fame in 1996.

== Personal life ==
She and her husband, Arthur D. Curry, had two children. After her husband's death in 1958, she resided in Englewood, Colorado. At the age of 87 she sustained a wrist fracture after slipping on some ice; she died from medical complications on February 14, 1986.

== Sources ==
- Varnell, Jeanne (1999). Women of Consequence: The Colorado Women's Hall of Fame. Big Earth Publishing. ISBN 1555662145.
