= Jon Winkelried =

American financial executive

- Born: c. 1959 (age 66–67)
- Education: University of Chicago (BA, MBA)
- Occupation: CEO of TPG
- Spouse: Abby Lipsey
- Children: 3

Jon Winkelried (born c. 1959) is an American financial executive. He is currently the CEO of TPG. Previously, he served as the co-president of Goldman Sachs from 2006 to February 2009. He is known for suddenly retiring at the peak of his career at age 49 from Goldman Sachs.

== Early life and education ==
Winkelried grew up in Millburn, New Jersey, the son of a Jewish father, Irwin, who managed local parking garages, and a mother who was a schoolteacher. He attended the University of Chicago where he earned both an undergraduate degree and an MBA and played baseball. While in school he joined Phi Gamma Delta with his good friend Byron Trott who was also on the baseball team.

== Career ==
Winkelried worked as an intern in the equities trading department at Goldman Sachs in the summer prior to graduating in 1982. He later accepted a permanent job at Goldman in the investment banking department in the Utilities Group. In 1984, he moved to the trading floor and soon was heading up the bond syndication business. In 1990, he became a partner. From there, he moved to London to turn around the European side of Goldman's fixed-income, currency, and commodities division (known as FICC). He was made co-head of FICC with Lloyd Blankfein. FICC was returned to solid profitability.

In June 2006, Goldman's CEO Henry Paulson, Winkelried's mentor, accepted a position as the Secretary of the Treasury under President George W. Bush. Blankfein was appointed the new CEO and Winkelried was made co-chief operating officer and co-president with Gary Cohn. Their responsibilities were divided with Cohn running the trading and asset management side of the business (including FICC) and Winkelried responsible for investment and merchant banking.

Eventually Cohn's business lines were outperforming his own and Winkelried, sensing that his position was tenuous (especially as Cohn was very close to Blankfein) decided that he would leave the firm. His last act would be to secure a $5B convertible preferred investment from Warren Buffett in Goldman during the financial crisis to secure the company's solvency. Blankfein was not happy with his decision to leave.

Winkelried was named co-CEO of TPG in October 2015 and then named CEO of TPG in May 2021.

In 2023, Winkelried's total compensation from TPG was $198.7 million, up 487% from the previous year and representing a CEO-to-median worker pay ratio of 683-to-1 for the company, as well as making Winkelried the highest paid CEO in the US that year.

== Personal life ==
Winkelried has been married to Abby Lipsey, a preschool teacher, since 1986. They have three children: Matt, Jen, and J.

Winkelried is the owner of two ranches in Meeker, Colorado: the Marvine and the Pot Hole. Winkelried is an expert "cutter," a sport in which horseback riders separate a calf from the herd (historically done for vaccination, castration, or sorting purposes). He serves on the board of trust of Vanderbilt University and the Board of Overseers of Memorial Sloan Kettering Cancer Center.
