= St. James Episcopal Church (Meeker, Colorado) =

Historic church in Colorado, United States

- U.S. National Register of Historic Places
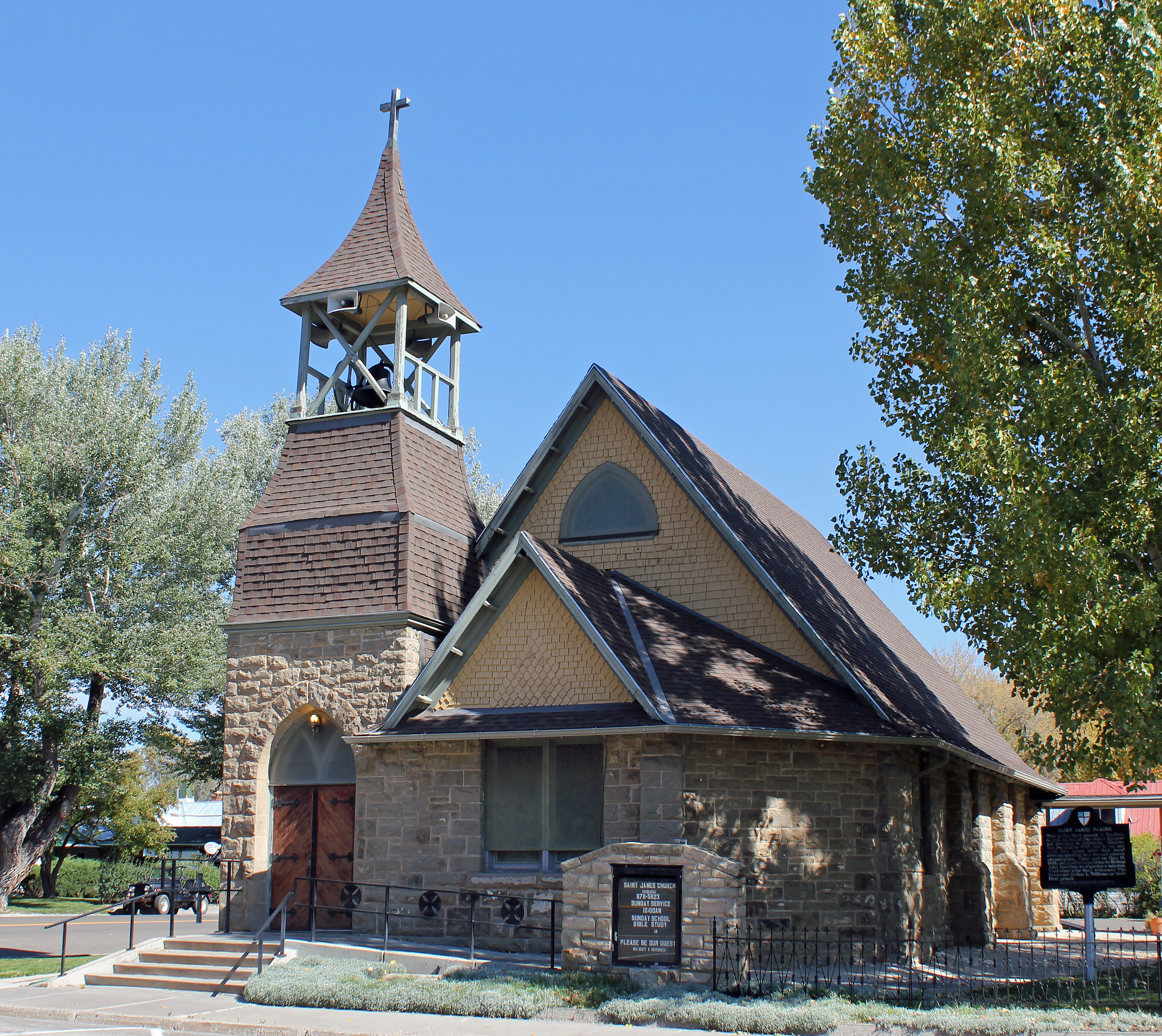

- Location within Colorado Location within the United States
- Location: 368 4th St., Meeker, Colorado
- Coordinates: 40°02′19″N 107°54′37″W
- Built: 1890
- NRHP reference No.: 78000883
- Added to NRHP: March 30, 1978

The St. James Episcopal Church in Meeker, Colorado is a historic church at 368 4th Street. It was built in 1890 and was added to the National Register of Historic Places in 1978.

It was deemed "significant because it is the first church in Meeker, as well as one of the oldest Episcopal churches in Colorado. As such it has played and is still playing an important role in the religious life of the area."
