= Pyramid Guard Station =

- U.S. National Register of Historic Places
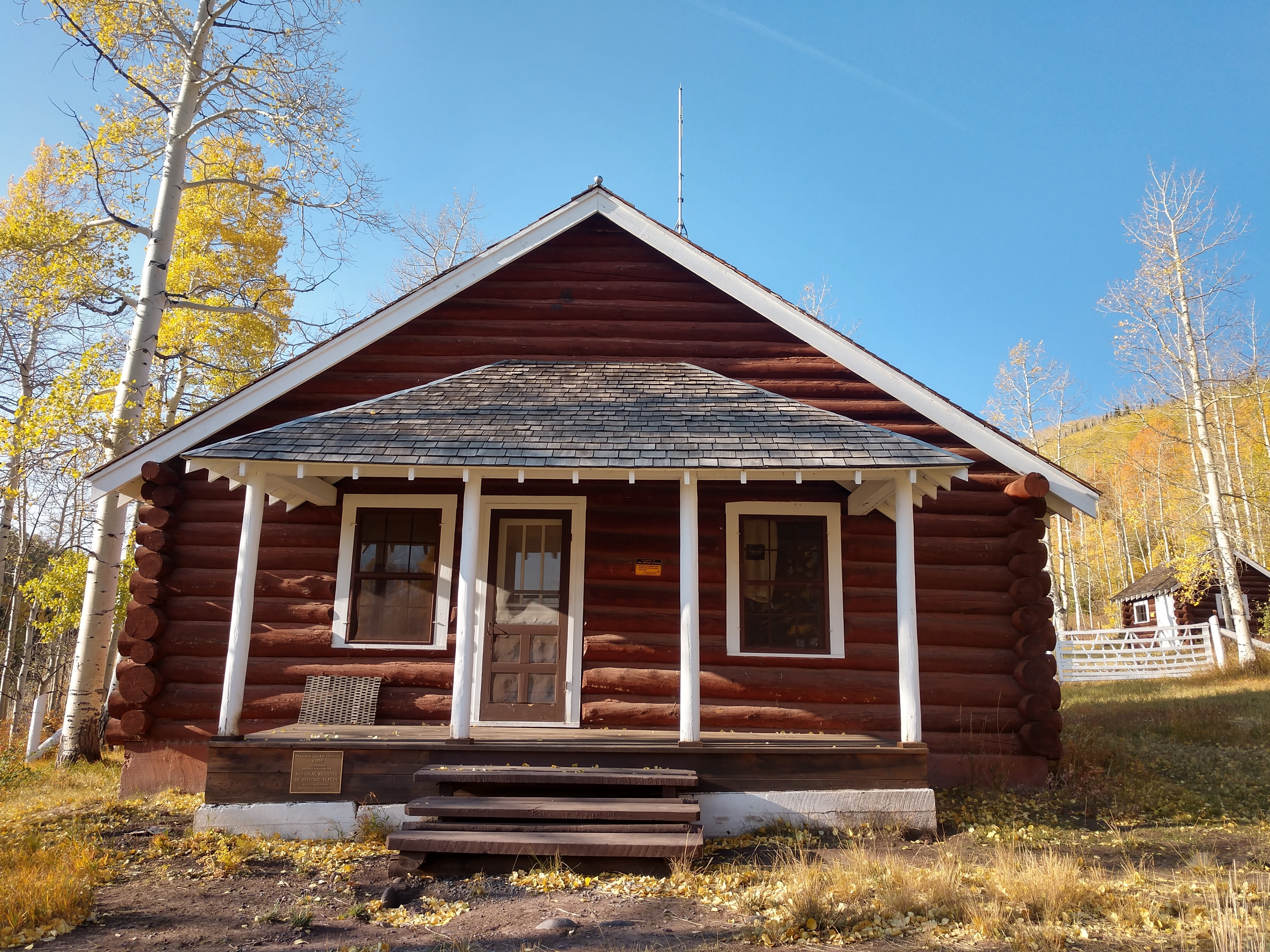

- Location within Colorado
- Nearest city: Yampa, Colorado
- Coordinates: 40°09′10″N 107°13′26″W
- Area: 1 acre (0.40 ha)
- Built: 1934
- Built by: Civilian Conservation Corps
- Architect: James L. Brownlee
- Architectural style: Rustic
- NRHP reference No.: 07001354
- Added to NRHP: January 10, 2008

The Pyramid Guard Station, in Rio Blanco County, Colorado near Yampa, Colorado, was built in 1934. It is located off County Route 8 in Routt National Forest, between Dunckley Pass and Ripple Pass. It is just west of the East Fork Williams Fork in an aspen forest.

It was listed on the National Register of Historic Places in 2008. The listing included five contributing buildings and a contributing structure.

The first building completed is the residence and guard station building, built in 1934. It was designed by Rustic style by James L. Brownlee, then the District Head Engineer in Denver. In 1935 a barn and a "combination office building" were added.
