= Meeker Hotel =

- U.S. National Register of Historic Places
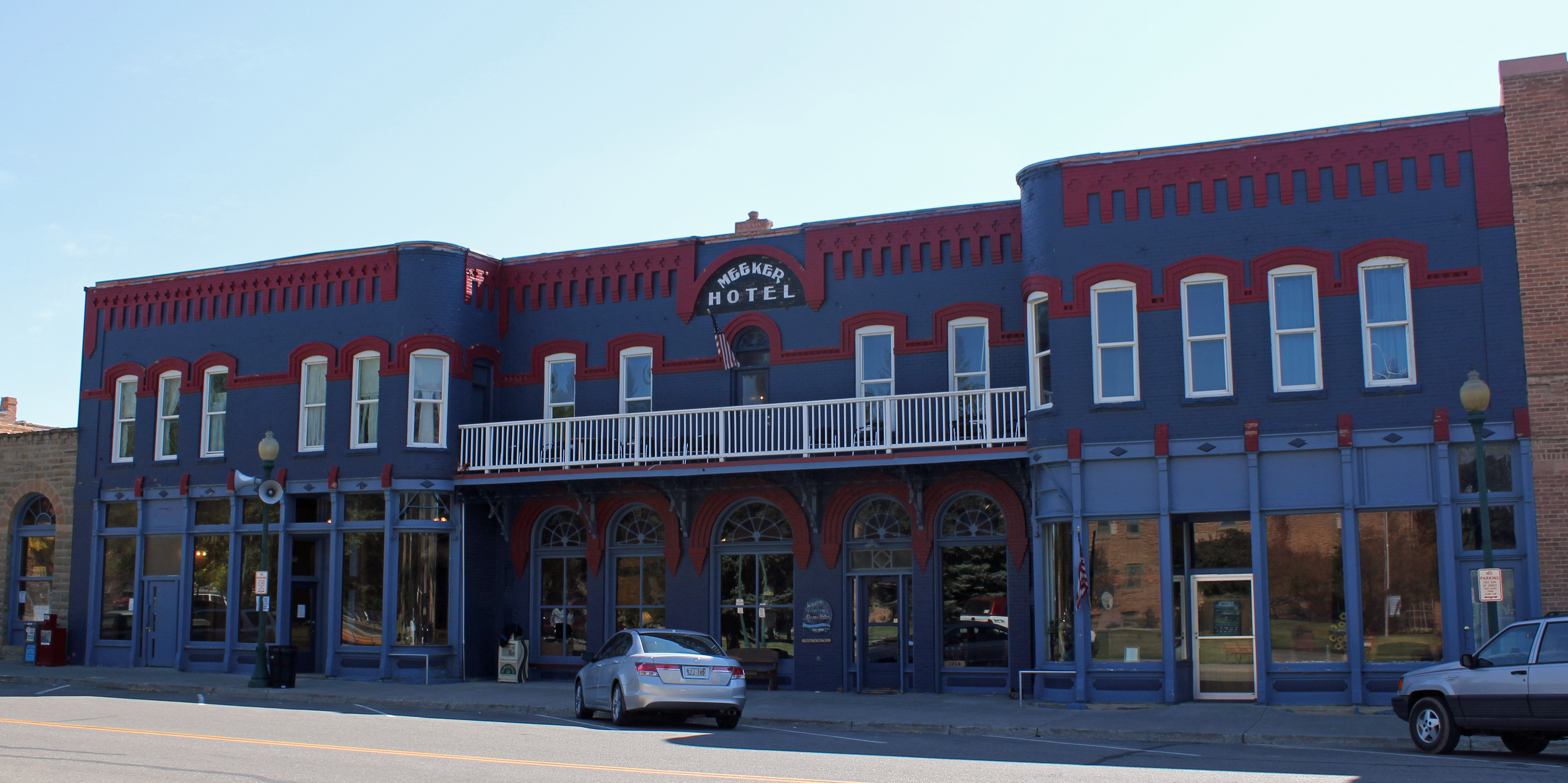
- The Hotel Meeker in 2012.

- Location within Colorado Location within the United States
- Location: 560 Main St., Meeker, Colorado
- Coordinates: 40°2′15.1″N 107°54′48.2″W
- Area: 1 acre (0.40 ha)
- Built: 1896
- NRHP reference No.: 80000923
- Added to NRHP: May 7, 1980

The Meeker Hotel dates from 1896 and is one of the oldest operating hotels in Colorado. It is listed on the National Register of Historic Places.

== Description ==
The hotel was built in 1896, at a time when Meeker was a prominent stagecoach stop and visitors were drawn to the beauty of the White River Valley. At this time there were many hotels in Meeker, but none compared with the brick structure built by Rueben Sanford Ball. An east and west wing were added to the hotel in 1904, greatly expanding its square footage and boosting the number of rooms to forty. A series of pictures by H.A. Wildhack depict the building of the hotel. Construction on the hotel took place between June 9, 1896, and July 15, 1896. Materials were being shipped by freight wagon from Rifle.

The Meeker Hotel is the only historic hotel still standing in the northwest corner of Colorado.

== Meeker Café history ==
The stone building, which currently houses the Meeker Café, was originally called the Vorges Building. It opened for business on May 9, 1891, as Meeker's new Post Office building. In 1904, it became the 1st National Bank Building and in 1918, Rueben S. Ball moved the café out of the hotel to its present location. Phil Jensen, longtime resident of Meeker, related a story of how back in the early 1930s he sat in the café's antique booths when they were located in the Midwest Café in Craig. Sometime in the mid-1930s the art deco style booths, counter top and bar back were moved to the Meeker Café.

== Historic site ==
The hotel was listed on the National Register of Historic Places in 1980.
