= Meeker, Colorado =

Town in and county seat of Rio Blanco County, Colorado, United States

- Statutory town
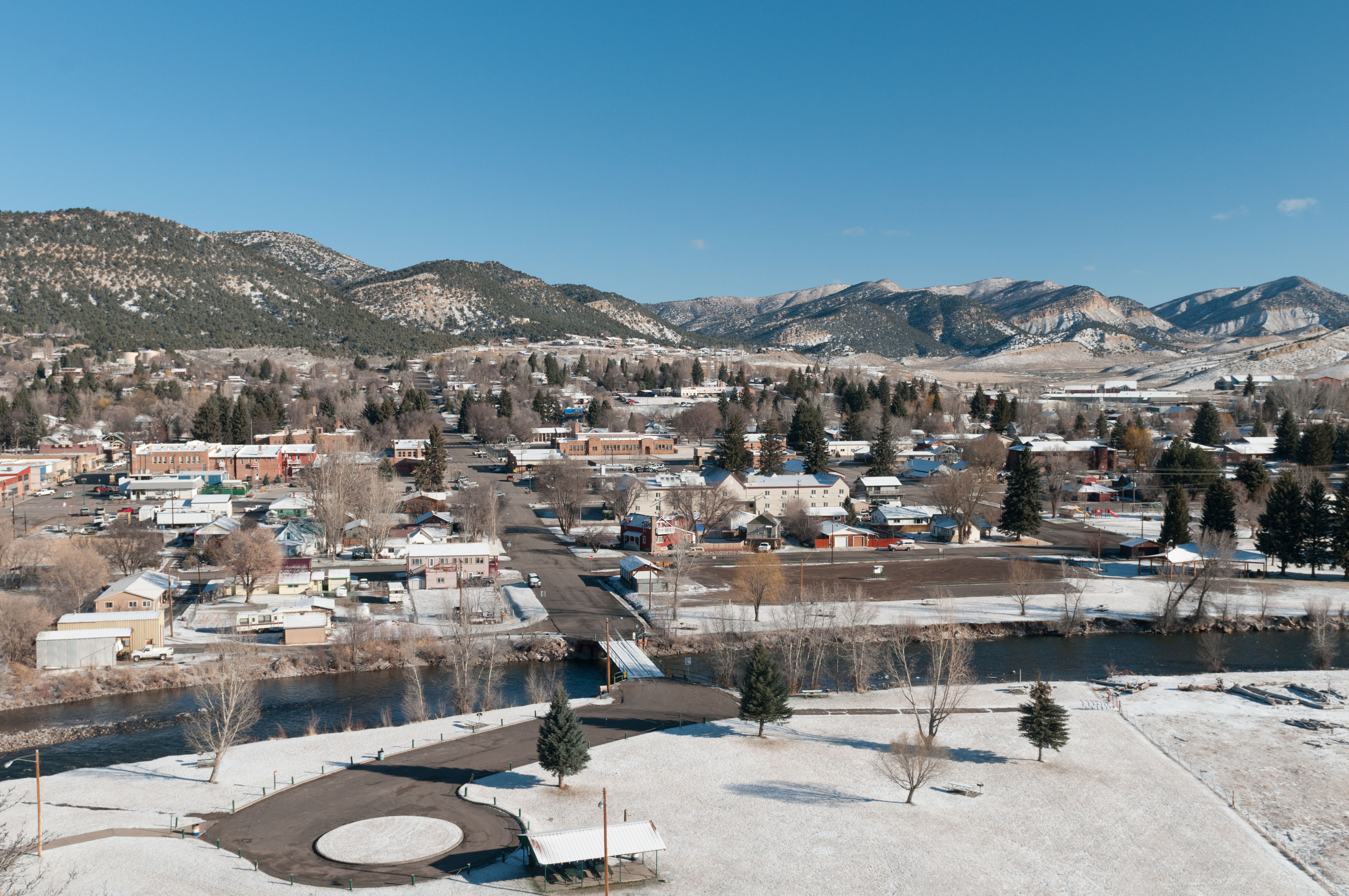
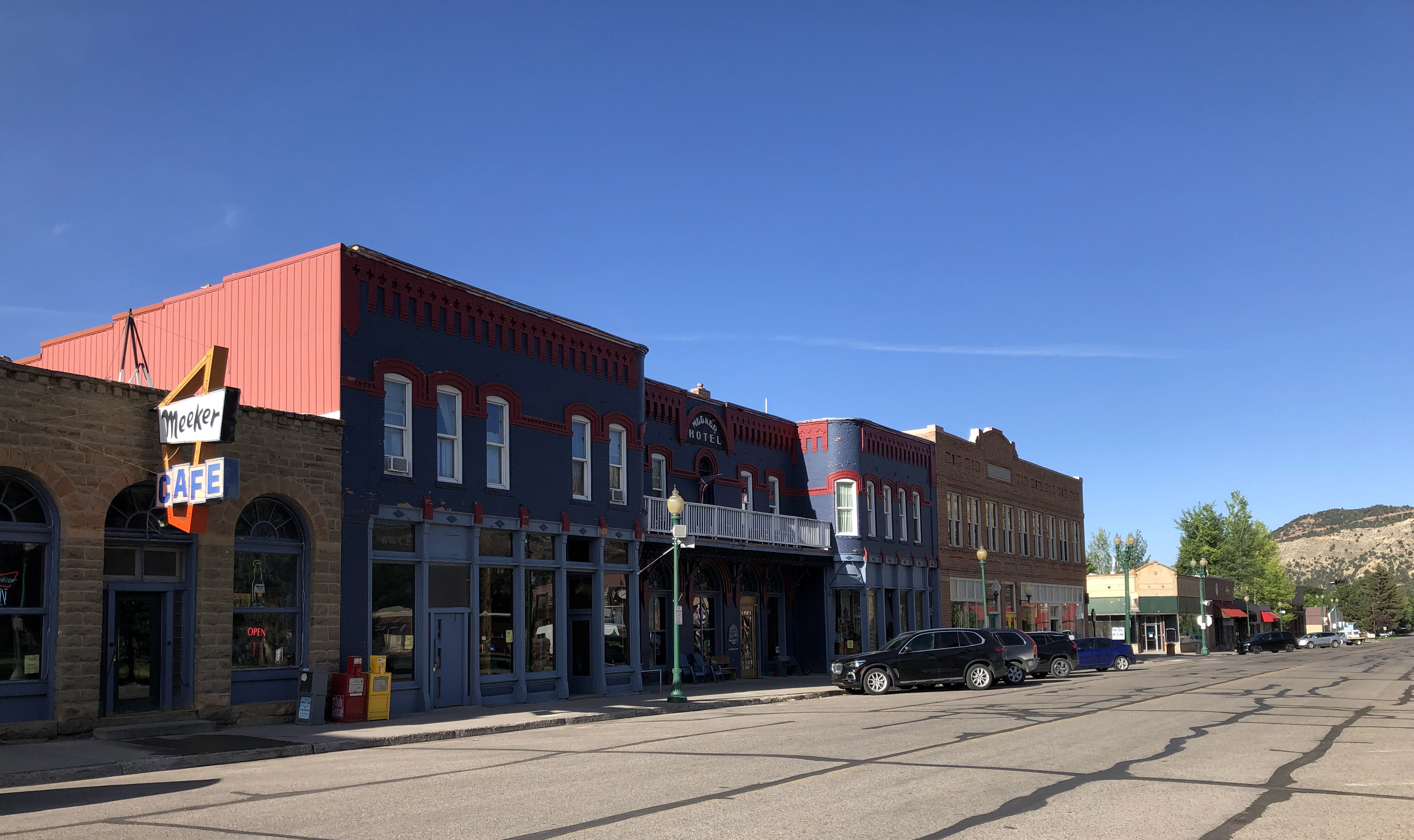
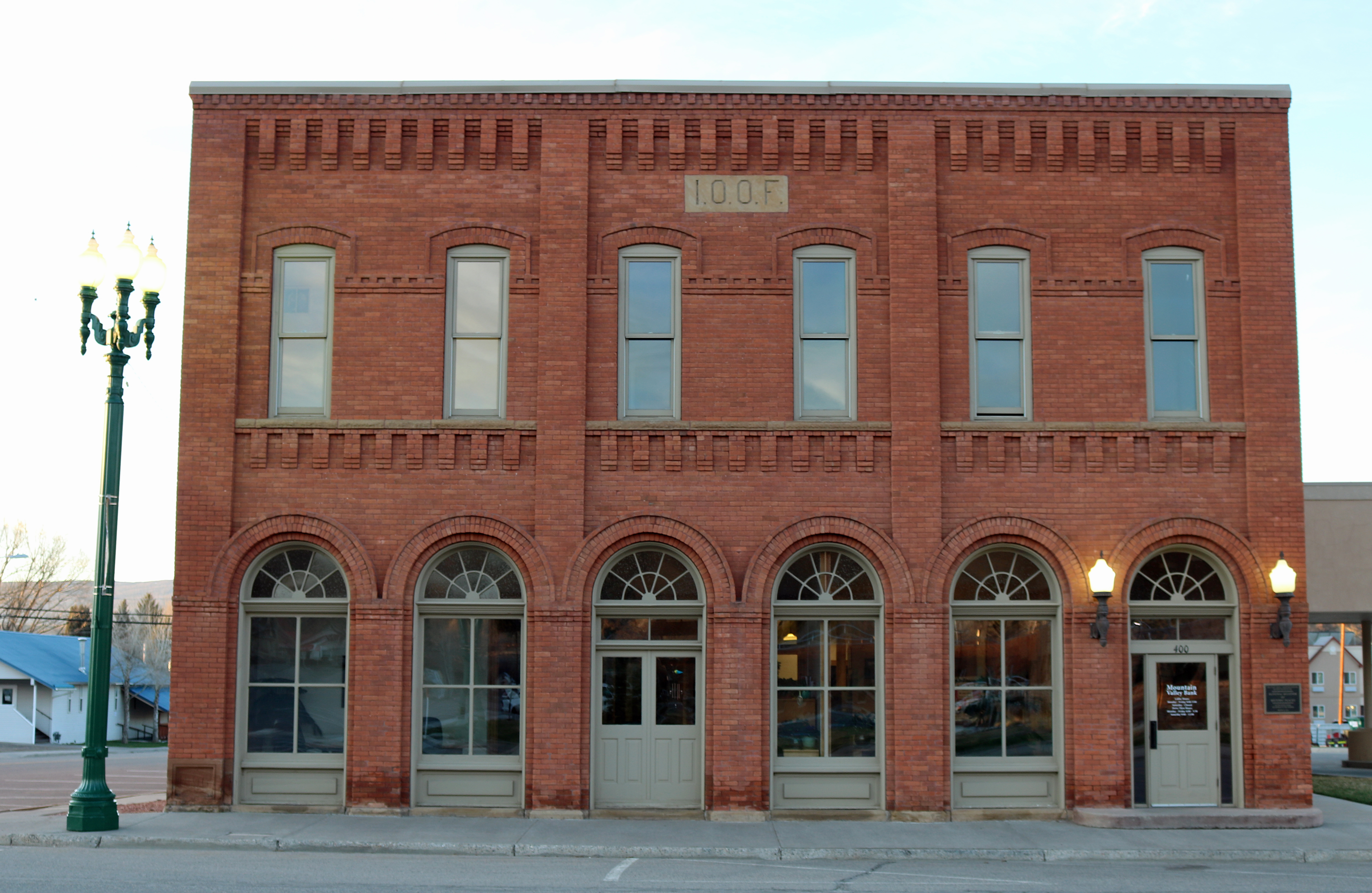
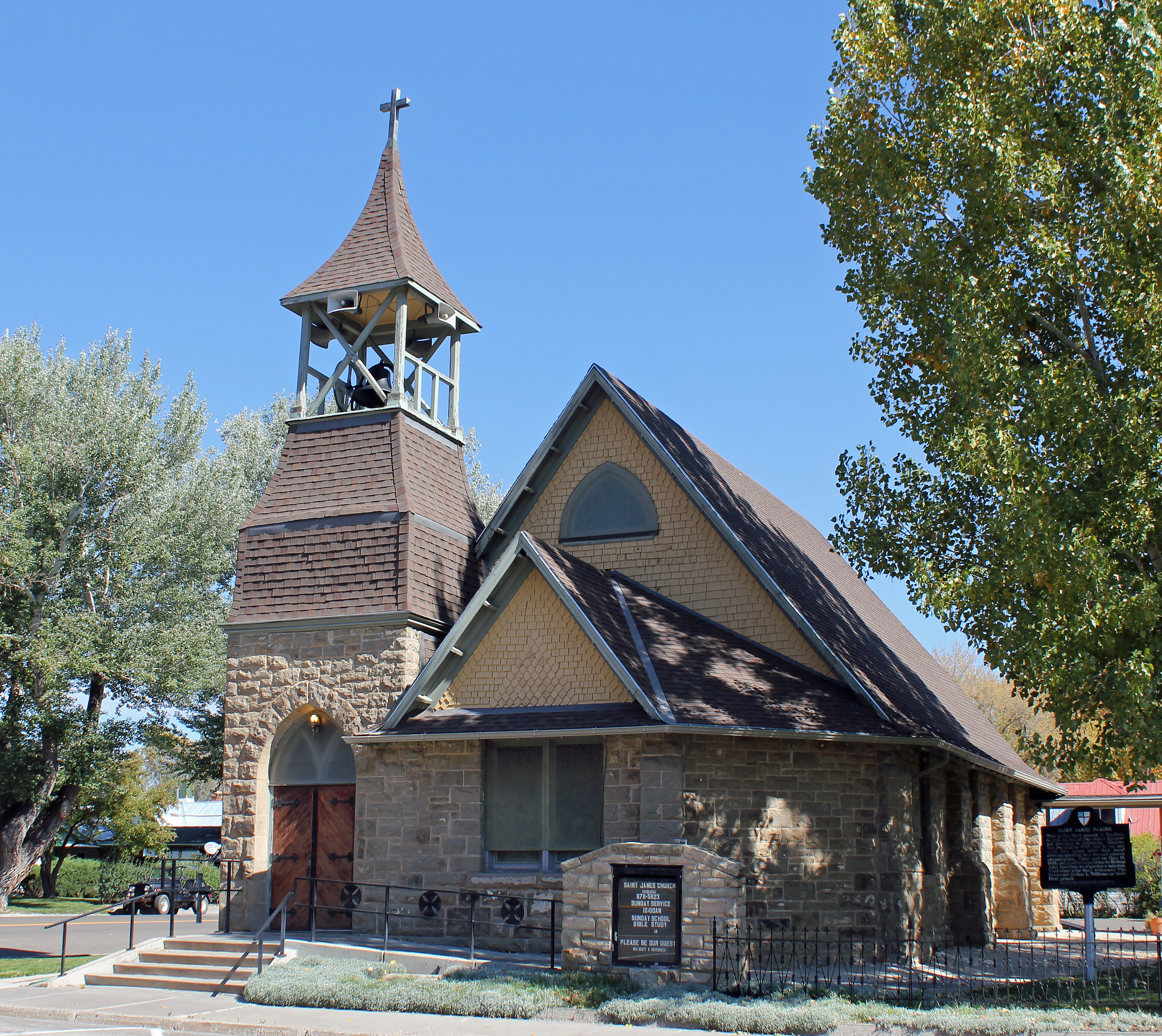
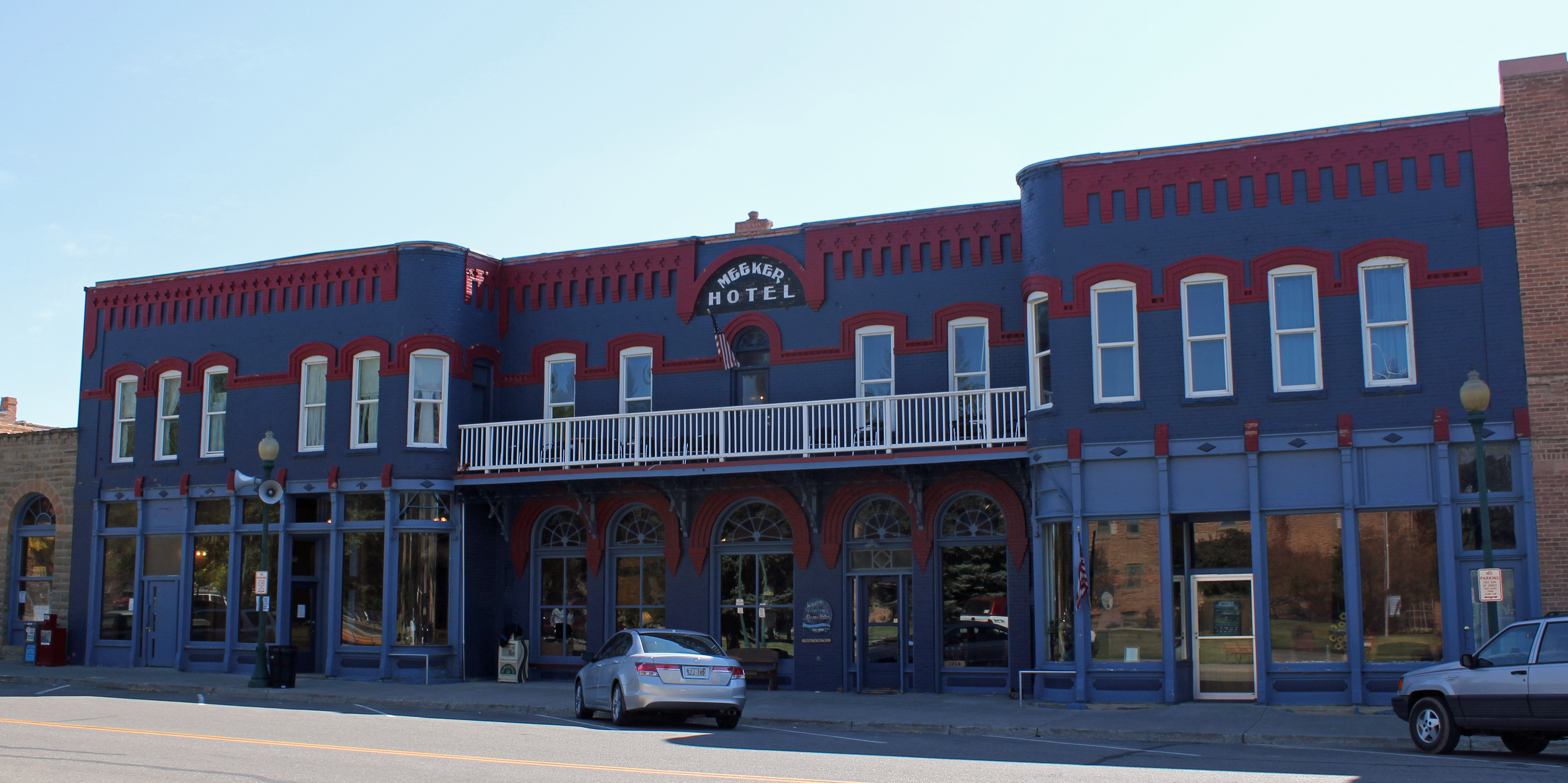
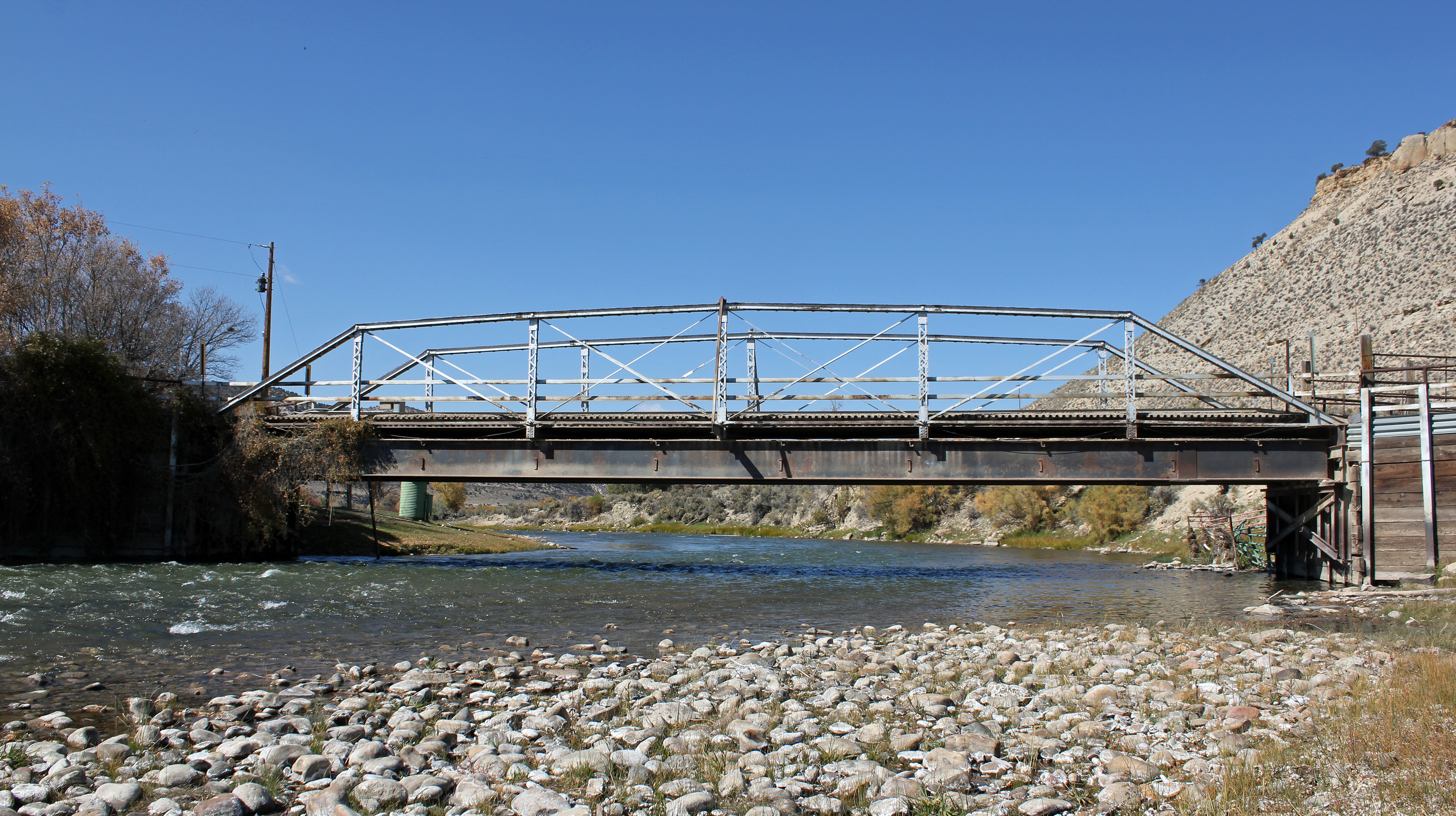
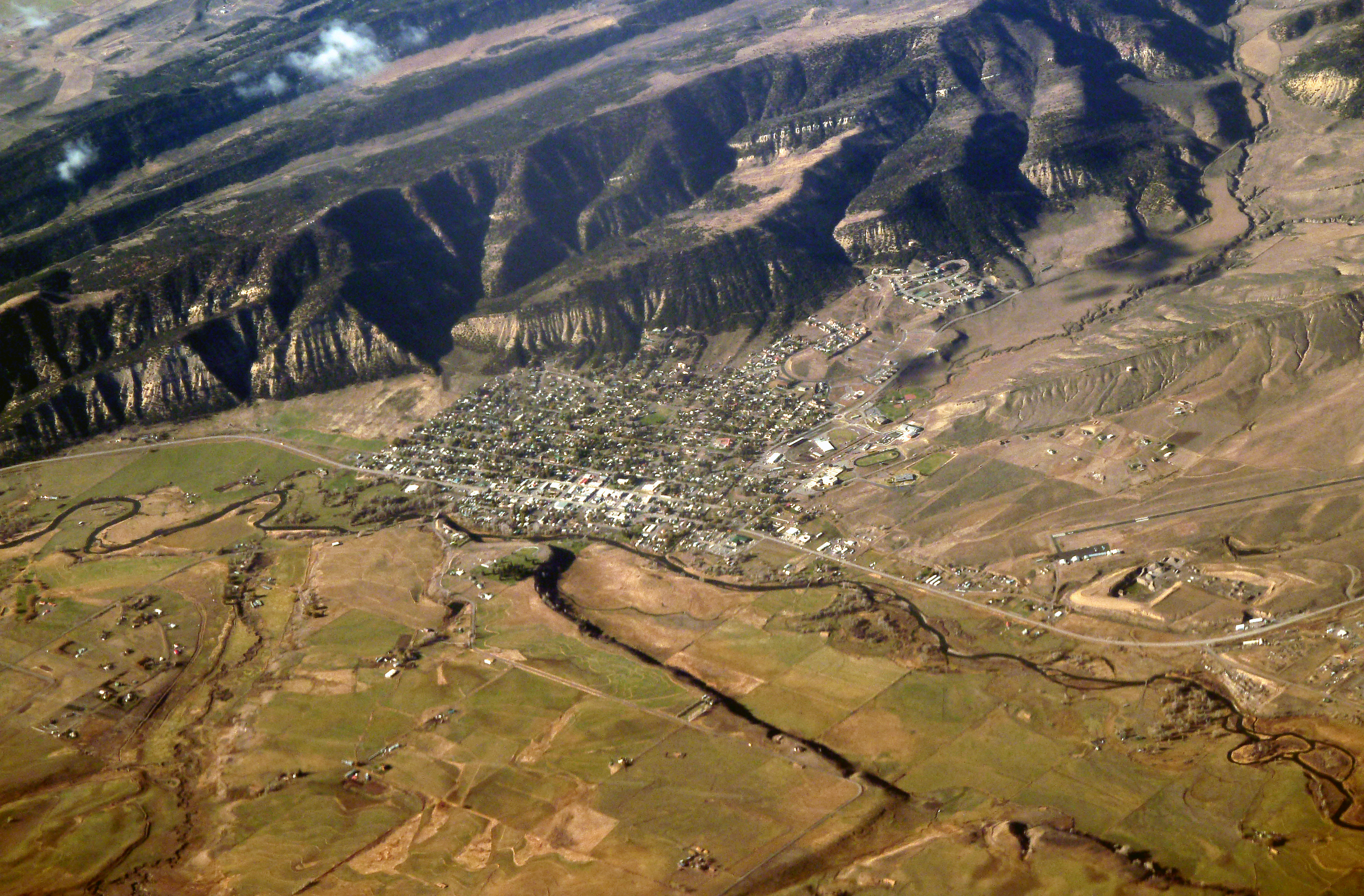
- Meeker, Colorado, as seen from Highland Cemetery Meeker Historic District Meeker I.O.O.F. Lodge St. James Episcopal Church Hotel Meeker Hay's Ranch Bridge Aerial view of Meeker, November 2010
- Motto: The river runs through it.
- Location of Meeker in Rio Blanco County, Colorado.
- Coordinates: 40°03′18″N 107°53′10″W
- Country: United States
- State: Colorado
- County: Rio Blanco (County seat)
- Founded: 1883
- Incorporated: 1885-11-10
- Named for: Nathan Meeker

Government
  - Mayor: Travis Day

Area
  - Total: 3.59 sq mi (9.30 km^{2})
  - Land: 3.59 sq mi (9.30 km^{2})
  - Water: 0 sq mi (0.00 km^{2})
- Elevation: 6,444 ft (1,964 m)

Population (2020)
  - Total: 2,374
  - Density: 661/sq mi (255/km^{2})
- Time zone: UTC-7 (MST)
  - Summer (DST): UTC-6 (MDT)
- ZIP code: 81641
- Area code: 970
- FIPS code: 08-49875
- GNIS feature ID: 2412977
- Website: Town of Meeker

Meeker is a statutory town in and the county seat of Rio Blanco County, Colorado, United States, that is the most populous municipality in the county. The town population was 2,374 at the 2020 United States census.

== Description ==
The town is largely a ranching community, located in the wide fertile valley of the White River in northwestern Colorado. Relatively isolated from other communities, it sits near the intersection of State Highway 13 and State Highway 64, on the north side of the White River and at the base of a long ridge. The Bureau of Land Management has a regional office in the town. Meeker is the home of the annual Meeker Classic Sheepdog trials.

== History ==
The town is named for Nathan Meeker, the United States Indian Agent who was killed along with 11 other white citizens by White River Ute Indians in the 1879 Meeker Incident, also known as the Meeker Massacre. The site of the uprising, the former White River Indian Agency, is located along State Highway 64 in the White River valley west of town and is marked by a prominent sign. None of the buildings remain.

Meeker was the first incorporated town in northwestern Colorado and is the county seat for Rio Blanco county. The town was incorporated in 1885 and became the central hub of banking and trade in Northwestern Colorado for several generations.

After the uprising and the ensuing conflict known as the Ute War, in 1880 the US Congress passed legislation requiring the Ute population to relocate to reservations in Utah. The United States Army established a garrison on the current site of the town, called the Camp at White River. The town was founded in 1883 following the removal of the troops. The White River Museum is located just north of the Rio Blanco County Courthouse and housed in several original wooden structures of the Army garrison.

The town emerged as a regional center for hunting by the turn of the 20th century. Theodore Roosevelt visited the town twice in 1901 and in 1905 on a mountain lion and bear hunting trip and stayed in the historic Hotel Meeker opposite the courthouse. The town and surrounding area has been a destination or residence for many prominent Americans, including Michael Bloomberg, former mayor of New York, Henry Kravis, former president and COO of Goldman Sachs Jon Winkelried, and comedian Daniel Tosh.

In August 2025, the Elk Fire and Lee Fire burned near Meeker and prompted pre evacuation for the town.

=== Meeker Historic District ===
Meeker Historic District was listed on the National Register of Historic Places in 2019 and includes parts of Main, 4th, 5th, 6th, 7th and 8th Streets.

== Geography ==
According to the United States Census Bureau, the town has a total area of 2.9 square miles (7.5 km^{2}), all of it land. The town is situated on the White River at an elevation of 6,250 feet (1,900 m) above sea level.

=== Climate ===
According to the Köppen Climate Classification system, Meeker has a warm-summer humid continental climate, abbreviated "Dfb" on climate maps. The hottest temperature recorded in Meeker was 103 °F (39.4 °C) on July 11, 1900, while the coldest temperature recorded was −43 °F (−41.7 °C) on January 7, 1913, and January 12, 1963.

Climate data for Meeker, Colorado, 1991–2020 normals, extremes 1893–present
Month	Jan	Feb	Mar	Apr	May	Jun	Jul	Aug	Sep	Oct	Nov	Dec	Year
Record high °F (°C)	61 (16)	65 (18)	83 (28)	86 (30)	93 (34)	102 (39)	103 (39)	99 (37)	94 (34)	86 (30)	74 (23)	63 (17)	103 (39)
Mean maximum °F (°C)	48.3 (9.1)	54.1 (12.3)	66.6 (19.2)	74.3 (23.5)	82.4 (28.0)	89.9 (32.2)	94.0 (34.4)	92.0 (33.3)	87.1 (30.6)	78.2 (25.7)	66.1 (18.9)	53.0 (11.7)	94.8 (34.9)
Mean daily maximum °F (°C)	33.9 (1.1)	39.2 (4.0)	50.3 (10.2)	58.1 (14.5)	67.9 (19.9)	79.4 (26.3)	86.4 (30.2)	83.5 (28.6)	75.5 (24.2)	62.7 (17.1)	48.0 (8.9)	35.1 (1.7)	60.0 (15.6)
Daily mean °F (°C)	20.1 (−6.6)	26.0 (−3.3)	36.0 (2.2)	42.9 (6.1)	51.2 (10.7)	60.7 (15.9)	67.0 (19.4)	64.9 (18.3)	56.8 (13.8)	45.0 (7.2)	33.3 (0.7)	21.7 (−5.7)	43.8 (6.6)
Mean daily minimum °F (°C)	6.4 (−14.2)	12.8 (−10.7)	21.7 (−5.7)	27.6 (−2.4)	34.6 (1.4)	40.9 (4.9)	47.6 (8.7)	46.2 (7.9)	38.2 (3.4)	27.3 (−2.6)	18.6 (−7.4)	8.4 (−13.1)	27.5 (−2.5)
Mean minimum °F (°C)	−15.3 (−26.3)	−9.7 (−23.2)	3.8 (−15.7)	12.9 (−10.6)	21.6 (−5.8)	30.8 (−0.7)	38.1 (3.4)	37.2 (2.9)	25.6 (−3.6)	12.4 (−10.9)	−2.8 (−19.3)	−14.4 (−25.8)	−19.9 (−28.8)
Record low °F (°C)	−43 (−42)	−38 (−39)	−24 (−31)	−5 (−21)	12 (−11)	17 (−8)	23 (−5)	29 (−2)	14 (−10)	−17 (−27)	−25 (−32)	−36 (−38)	−43 (−42)
Average precipitation inches (mm)	1.17 (30)	0.99 (25)	1.24 (31)	1.96 (50)	1.80 (46)	1.02 (26)	1.09 (28)	1.44 (37)	1.75 (44)	1.74 (44)	1.31 (33)	1.20 (30)	16.71 (424)
Average snowfall inches (cm)	13.7 (35)	11.3 (29)	8.7 (22)	4.9 (12)	0.6 (1.5)	0.0 (0.0)	0.0 (0.0)	0.0 (0.0)	0.2 (0.51)	3.3 (8.4)	9.9 (25)	12.2 (31)	64.8 (164.41)
Average extreme snow depth inches (cm)	11.2 (28)	11.3 (29)	6.9 (18)	3.1 (7.9)	0.8 (2.0)	0.0 (0.0)	0.0 (0.0)	0.0 (0.0)	0.1 (0.25)	2.4 (6.1)	5.3 (13)	8.7 (22)	13.3 (34)
Average precipitation days (≥ 0.01 in)	7.7	7.6	8.0	9.3	9.1	5.3	7.0	8.2	7.2	6.9	6.7	6.6	89.6
Average snowy days (≥ 0.1 in)	7.2	5.5	4.2	2.5	0.3	0.0	0.0	0.0	0.1	1.3	4.7	6.3	32.1
Source 1: NOAA
Source 2: National Weather Service

== Education ==
Meeker is served by Meeker School District RE-1. The district operates three schools in the city:

- Meeker Elementary School
- Barone Middle School
- Meeker High School

Colorado Northwestern Community College operates an academic service center in Meeker. The college's primary campuses are located in Rangely and Craig.

== Demographics ==
Historical population
Census	Pop.	Note	%±
1890	260		—
1900	507		95.0%
1910	807		59.2%
1920	935		15.9%
1930	1,069		14.3%
1940	1,399		30.9%
1950	1,658		18.5%
1960	1,655		−0.2%
1970	1,597		−3.5%
1980	2,356		47.5%
1990	2,098		−11.0%
2000	2,242		6.9%
2010	2,475		10.4%
2020	2,374		−4.1%

=== 2020 census ===
As of the 2020 census, Meeker had a population of 2,374. The median age was 37.4 years. 26.9% of residents were under the age of 18 and 19.5% of residents were 65 years of age or older. For every 100 females, there were 99.5 males, and for every 100 females age 18 and over, there were 94.1 males age 18 and over.

0.0% of residents lived in urban areas, while 100.0% lived in rural areas.

There were 987 households in Meeker, of which 33.8% had children under the age of 18 living in them. Of all households, 46.4% were married-couple households, 20.3% were households with a male householder and no spouse or partner present, and 27.7% were households with a female householder and no spouse or partner present. About 33.8% of all households were made up of individuals, and 15.9% had someone living alone who was 65 years of age or older.

There were 1,139 housing units, of which 13.3% were vacant. The homeowner vacancy rate was 3.8% and the rental vacancy rate was 10.0%.

Racial composition as of the 2020 census
Race	Number	Percent
White	2,052	86.4%
Black or African American	14	0.6%
American Indian and Alaska Native	18	0.8%
Asian	7	0.3%
Native Hawaiian and Other Pacific Islander	2	0.1%
Some other race	96	4.0%
Two or more races	185	7.8%
Hispanic or Latino (of any race)	258	10.9%

== Notable people ==
- Neal Blue, co-owner of General Atomics
- Virginia Neal Blue (1910–1970), Colorado State Treasurer from 1967 to 1970
- Margaret L. Curry (1898–1986), Colorado state parole officer
- Buddy Roosevelt, actor and stunt performer

== See also ==
- List of municipalities in Colorado
- Colorow Mountain State Wildlife Area, northwest of Meeker
