= Tetzlaff =

Tetzlaff is a surname. It is a German rendering of a West Slavic personal name. Notable pepople with the surname include:

- Charles Tetzlaff (born 1938), American attorney from Vermont
- Christian Tetzlaff (born 1966), German violinist, brother of Tanja
- Dale H. "Ted" Tetzlaff (1903–1995), American cinematographer
- Dieter Tetzlaff (born 1944), East German speedway rider
- Doris Tetzlaff (1921–1998), American baseball player
- Dörthe Tetzlaff (born 1974), German geologist
- Percy Tetzlaff (1920–2009), New Zealand rugby player
- Rob Tetzlaff (1935–2012), American Olympic cyclist
- Sarah Tetzlaff (born 2000), New Zealand speed climber
- Tanja Tetzlaff (born 1973), German cellist, sister of Christian
- Teddy Tetzlaff (1883–1929), American racecar driver
- Toni Tetzlaff (1871–1947), German actress
- Walter Tetzlaff, birth name of Walter Tetley (1915–1975), American child actor

== See also ==
- Tetzlaff Peak, a mountain in Utah, US
- Tetzlav (before 1163 – between 1170 and 1181), Prince of Rügen
