= Flat Tops (Colorado) =

Mountain range in Colorado, US

The Flat Tops
- Flattops
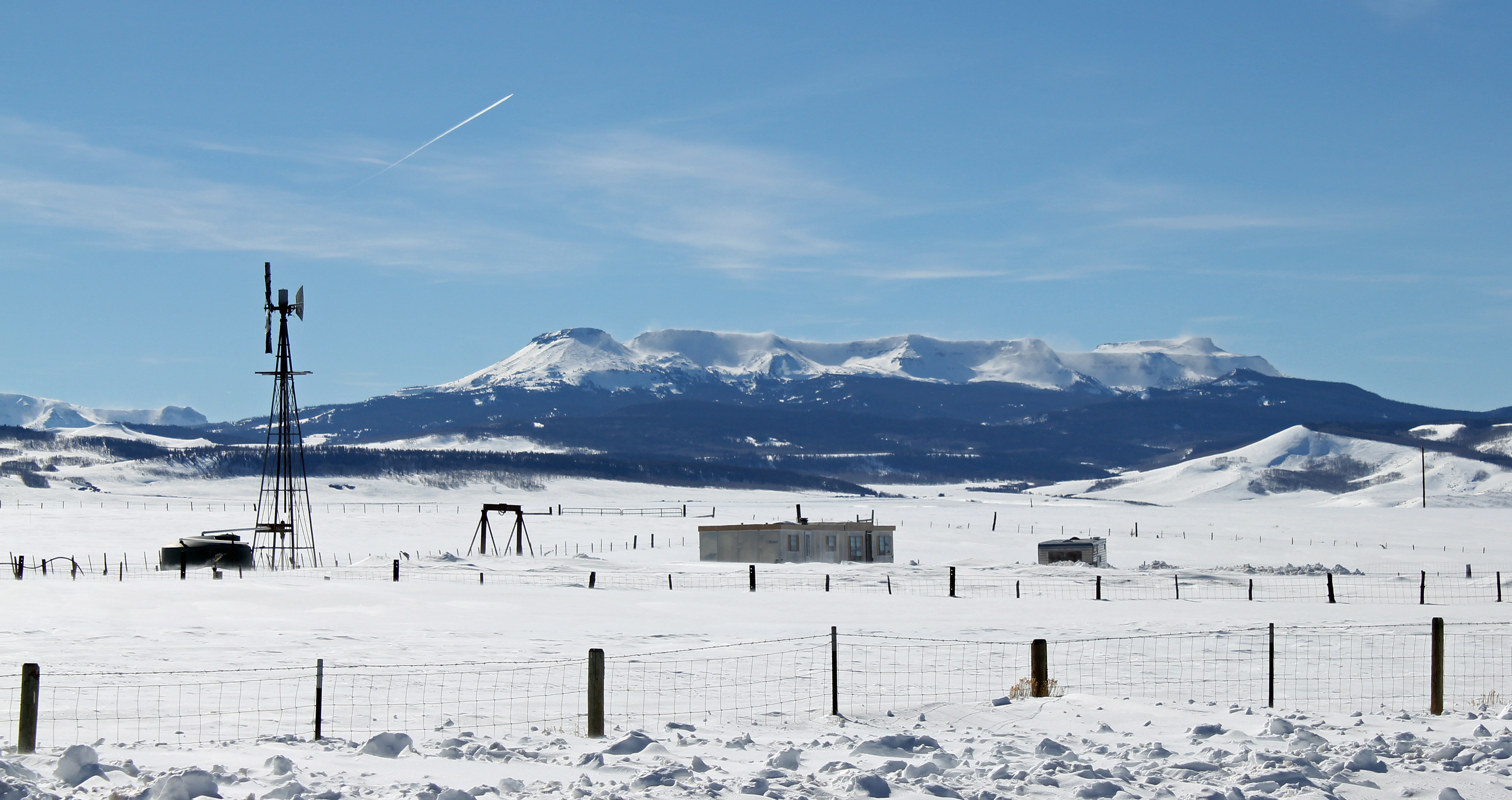
- The Flat Tops as seen from State Highway 131 in Routt County

Highest point
- Peak: Flat Top Mountain
- Elevation: 12,361 ft (3,768 m)
- Listing: Mountain ranges of Colorado
- Coordinates: 39°55′45″N 107°18′17″W

Geography
- Location within Colorado
- Country: United States
- State: Colorado
- Parent range: Rocky Mountains

The Flat Tops is a mountain range located in Colorado within the Routt and White River National Forests. Much of the range is within the boundary of the Flat Tops Wilderness Area. While there are notable peaks in the Flat Tops, the dominant feature of the range is the high plateau from which the peaks arise. The plateau forms the northeastern portion of the White River Uplift capped by horizontal basalt flows from tertiary volcanic activity and is bounded by steep drops to valleys carved out by subsequent glaciation. The resulting mix of areas of treeless plateau at an elevation of 11,000 to 12,000 feet interspersed with verdant valleys is unique among Colorado mountain ranges. The area contains approximately one hundred and ten ponds and lakes and is home to a wide variety of plants and animals, including many large mammals such as moose, elk, mule deer, black bear, and cougars. This area has been affected by the non-native plant species, yellow toadflax. The most common trees are Engelmann spruce, subalpine fir and lodgepole pine, with aspen groves at lower elevations. The top of the plateau is alpine tundra.

The highest point in the Flat Tops is the summit of Flat Top Mountain (12,361 ft) on the east side of the range. The Devil's Causeway, perhaps the most popular geologic feature and notorious hiking experience in the Flat Tops, is located in the same area. The Causeway is a narrow neck of the plateau where eroding glaciers on either side almost met. A trail crosses the Causeway which at its narrowest is 3 to 4 feet wide with drop-offs of hundreds of feet to the valleys on either side.

The eastern side of the Flat Tops Wilderness Area can be accessed by Routt County Rd 7 through the town of Yampa, Colorado.

The best-known destination approached from the west side of the range is Trappers Lake.

== Gallery ==
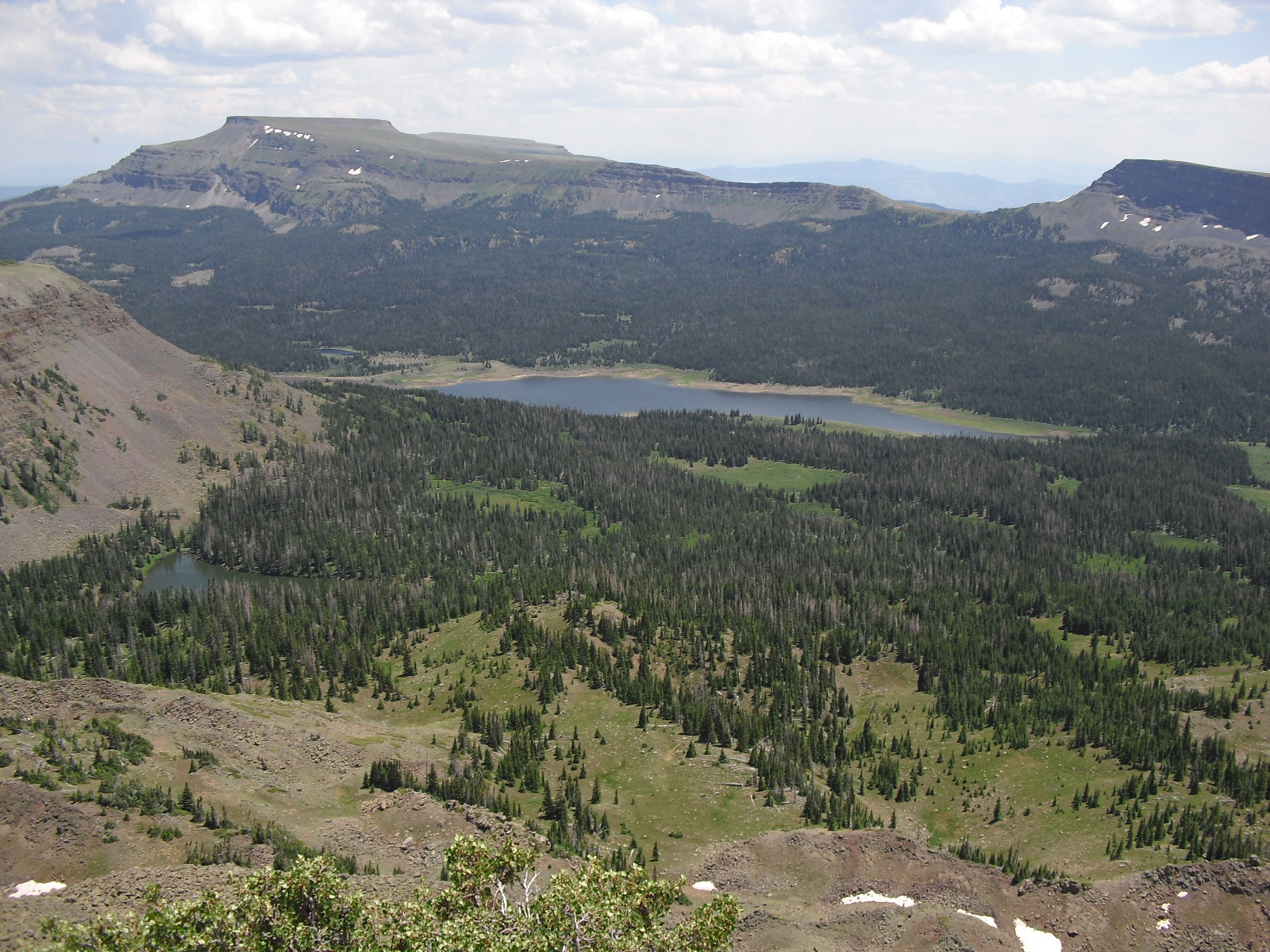
Flat Top Mountain, the highest peak in the Flat Tops (12,361 ft), overlooks Stillwater Reservoir.

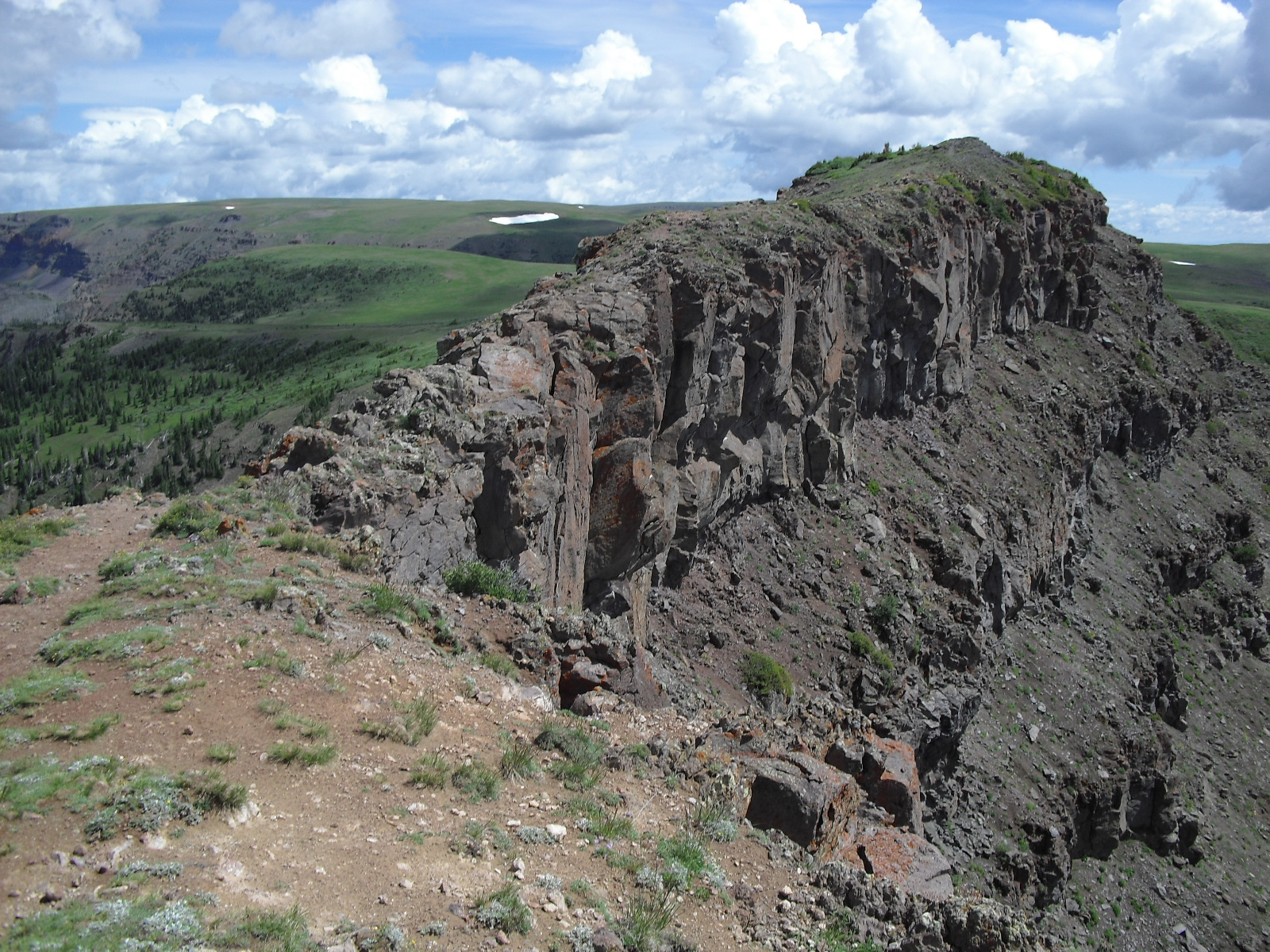
The Devil's Causeway is a unique geological feature and popular hiking destination.

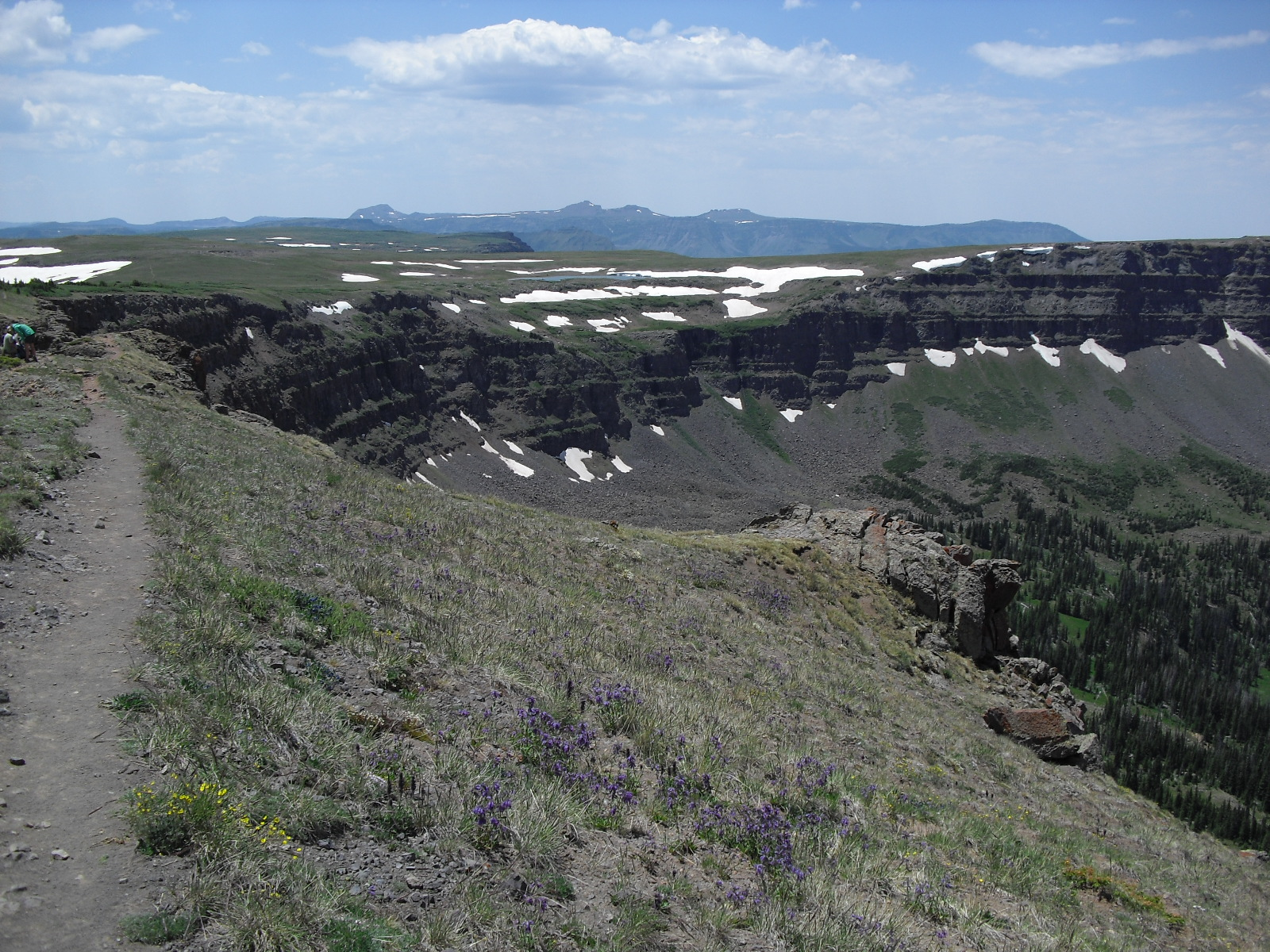
The layers of basalt that form the top of the plateau are exposed where glaciation has carved valleys.

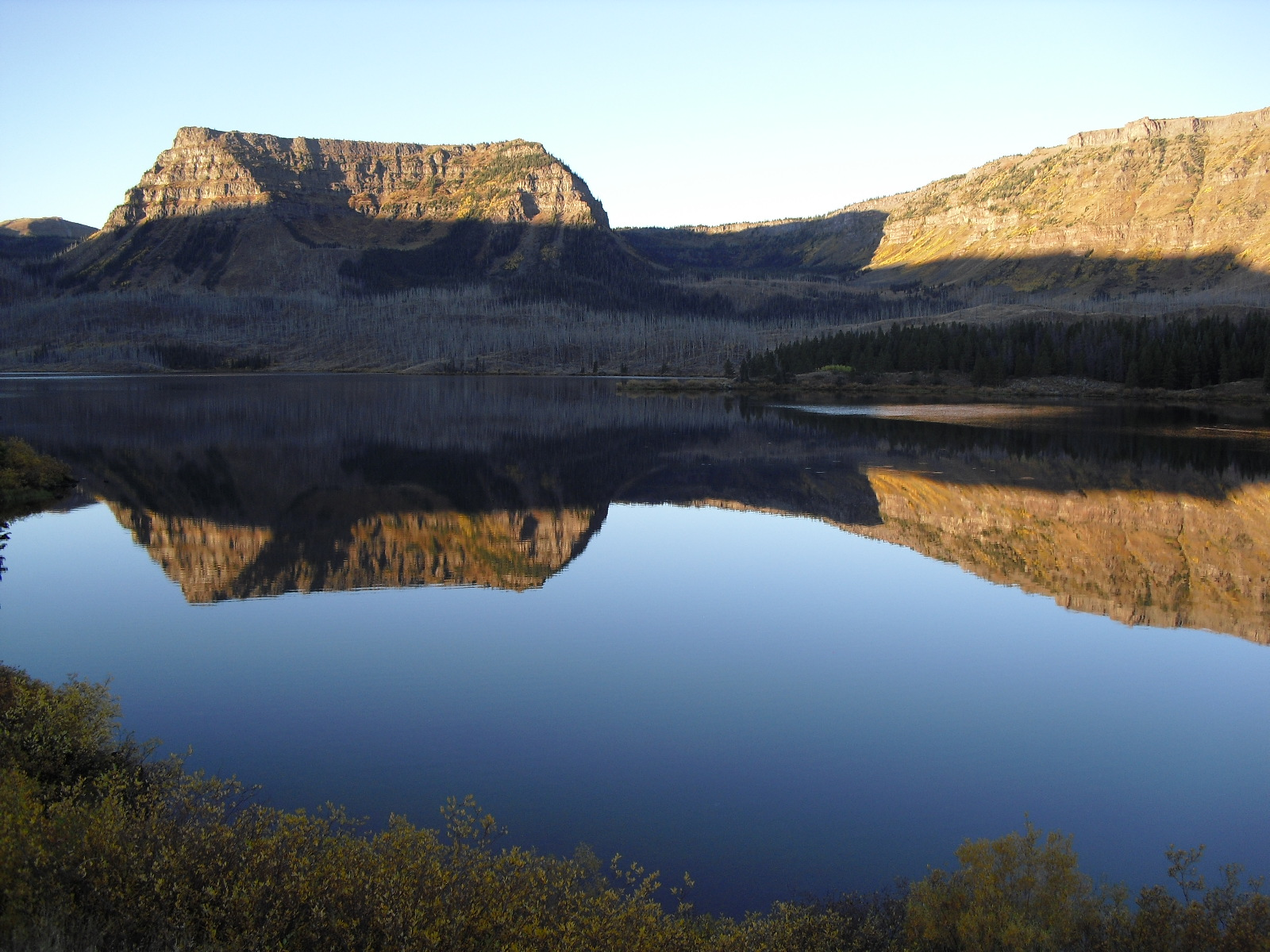
A September sunrise highlights the basalt cliffs above Trappers Lake.

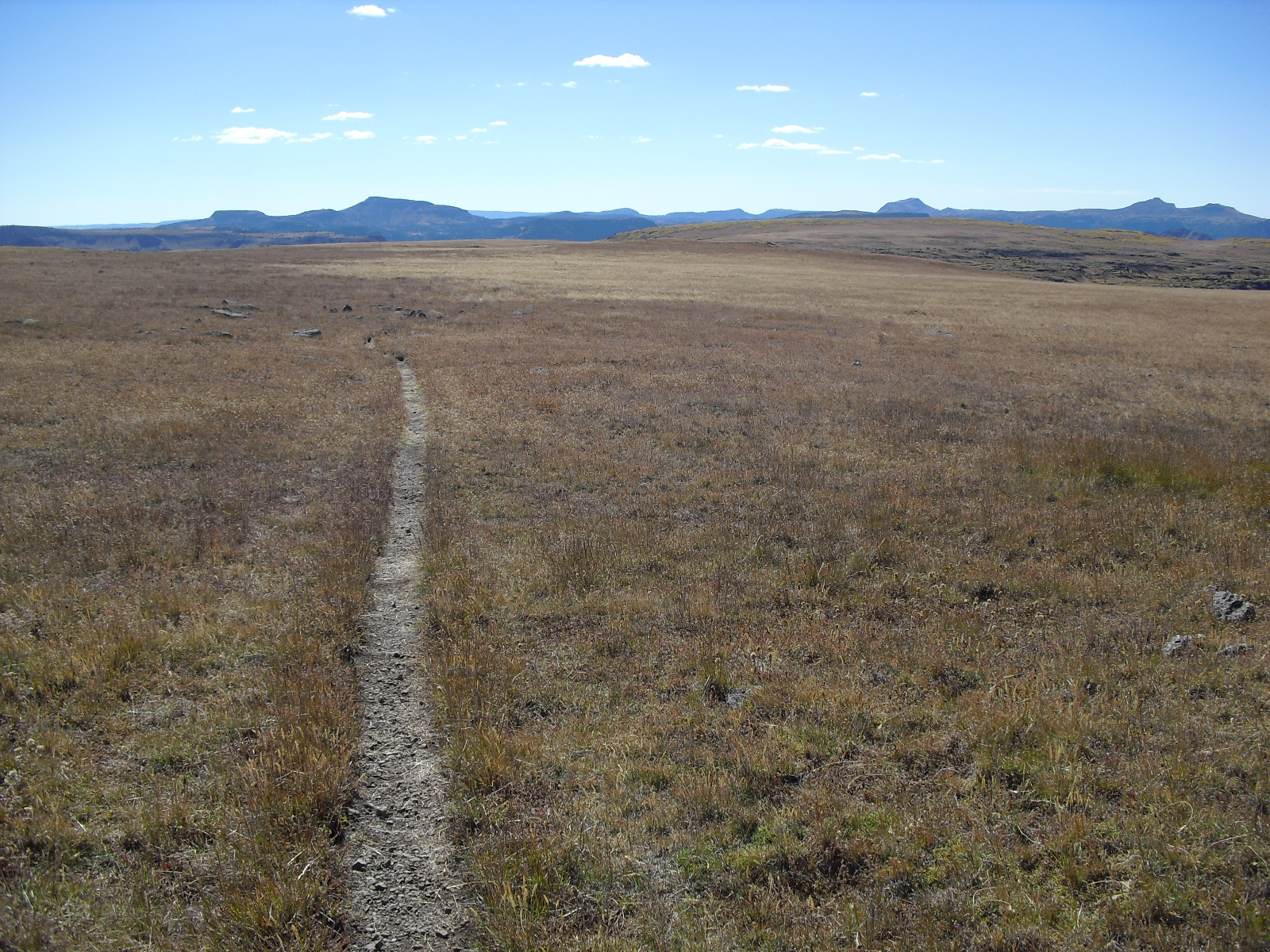
By late September the alpine flora on the plateau have turned brown. The distant peaks are part of the Flat Tops range.
