= Arthur Carhart =

Arthur Hawthorne Carhart (1892–1978) was a US Forest Service official, writer and conservationist who inspired wilderness protection in the United States. He was one of the first to realize the importance of conservation and became a nationally recognized authority on conservation practices.

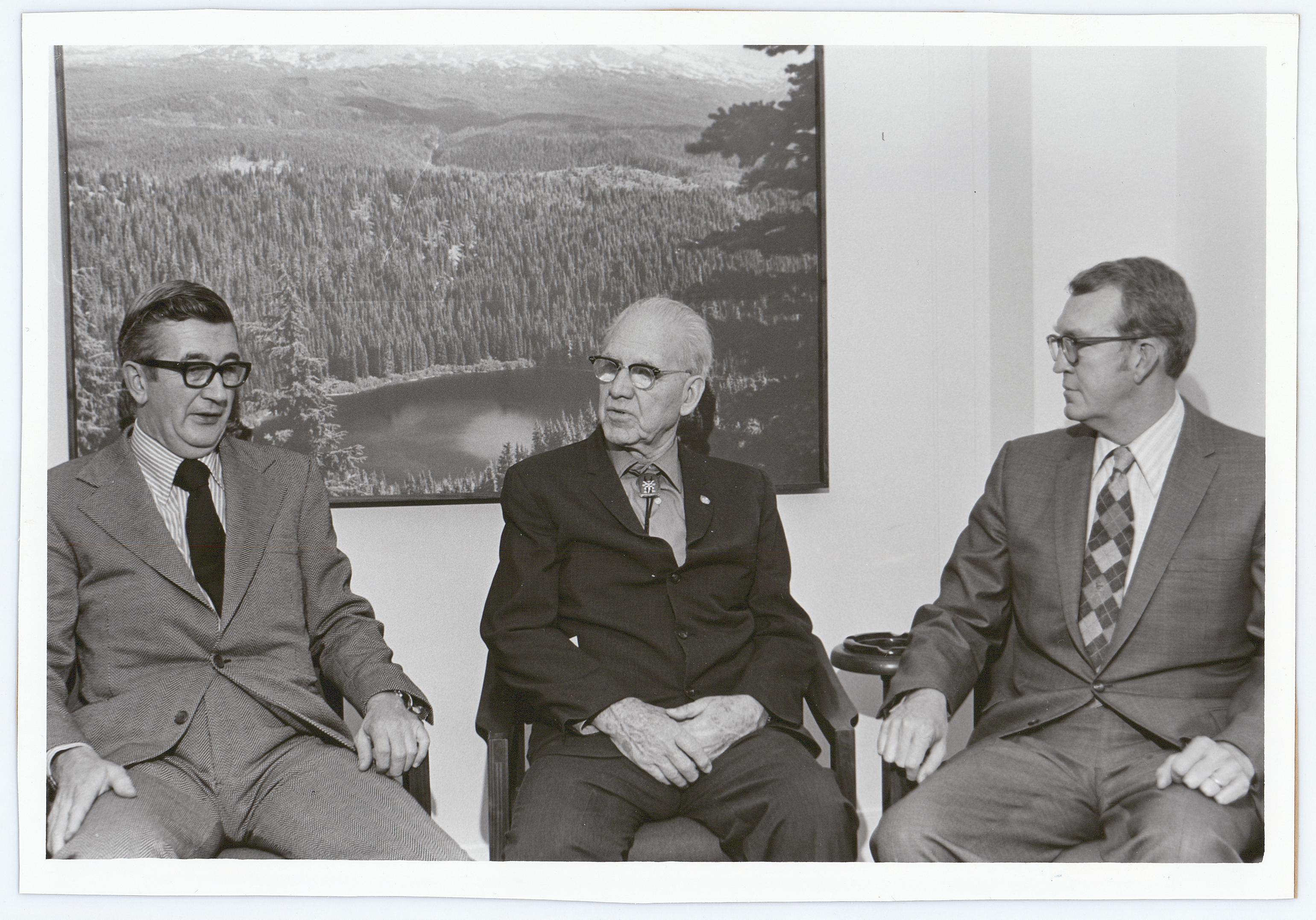
Carhart in 1973

== Biography ==
Carhart was born on September 18, 1892, in Mapleton, Iowa. He was the son of George W. and Ella Louise (Hawthorne) Carhart. His essay "The Downey Woodpecker" was published in The Women's Home Companion when he was eleven years old. In 1916, he was the first to graduate from Iowa State College with a Bachelor of Science degree in Landscape Design and City Planning. During his time at Iowa State College, he was a member of Acacia Fraternity. He worked for a Chicago landscaping architecture company until 1917, when he entered the United States Army for World War I. His education was put to use and he was made a lieutenant as a bacteriologist and public health officer in the Sanitary Corps at Camp Mead, Maryland. On August 16, 1918, he married Vera Amelia VanSickle. He left the Army after the war ended and moved to Denver, Colorado, to work for the United States Forest Service. He worked for the Forest Service from 1919 till 1922 as a recreation engineer.

== Work ==
In 1919, Carhart surveyed a road in the White River National Forest, near Trappers Lake for the Forest Service. Upon completion of the survey, he decided that the land should be preserved as wilderness. In December 1919, Carhart met with Aldo Leopold, his superior at the Forest Service, in Denver, Colorado. Carhart later submitted a memorandum to Leopold advocating for the Forest Service to preserve areas throughout the National Forests from human development.

There are great values of this type to be found in the several forests of the Nation, which in order to return to the greatest total value to the people, not only of the Nation, but of the world should be preserved and protected from the marring features of man made constructions. These areas can never be restored to the original condition after man has invaded them, and the great value lying as it does in natural scenic beauty should be available, not for the small group, but for the greatest population. Time will come when these scenic spots, where nature has been allowed to remain unmarred, will be some of the most highly prized scenic features of the country.

— Arthur Carhart, "Memorandum For Mr. Leopold, District 3, December 10, 1919"

The Forest Service canceled plans to build a road and summer cabins at Trappers Lake. The protection of Trappers Lake was the first of its kind in the history of the Forest Service. In 1975, Trappers Lake was officially designated as a U.S. Wilderness Area as part of the Flat Tops Wilderness Area. Carhart was the driving force behind recreational-use programs in national forests, first at San Isabel National Forest in Colorado and then at Superior National Forest in Minnesota.

In 1922 Federal funding was lost, and he left the Forest Service for private practice in land architecture and city planning as a partner in McCrary, Culley & Carhart. He sold his first book in 1928 and sold his interests in the firm to work full-time as a freelance writer in 1931. He made a living selling books, short stories and magazine articles for eight years. He then became the Colorado co-ordinator for the Federal Aid in Wildlife Restoration program, a position he held until 1943. He worked as the U.S. Office of Price Administration's information executive for the Rocky Mountain Region from 1944 to 1946. In 1946, he returned to writing. He wrote twenty-four books and over 4,000 articles. Carhart wrote historical novels, westerns, and books, stories and articles about forestry, wildlife management, and conservation. From 1960 to 1970, he served as a consultant to the Conservation Library Center At the Denver Public Library.

== Memberships ==
Carhart was an honorary member of the Outdoor Writers Association of America, and the American Society of Landscape Architects, and the American Forestry Association. He was a member of the Desert Protective Association, Colorado Authors League, serving as President, and was a founder and president of the Denver Posse of the Westerners. He served as a trustee, J. N. "Ding" Darling Foundation, was a member of the Citizens Committee on Natural Resources, and served as a member of historical advisory committee, American Forestry Association Centennial Celebration from 1970 to 1972.

== Awards ==
He received a number of awards. He received the Izaak Walton League of America's Founders Award in 1956, the Outdoor Writers Association of America's Conservation Award in 1958, the American Forest Products Industries Award for conservation in 1966, and the American Motors Conservation Award. In 1968, the Colorado Game and Fish Commission made him and Honorary Game Protector. In 1972, the Alumni Association of Iowa State University gave him a Distinguished Achievement Citation.

== Death ==
He moved to California when ill health required that he live closer to his niece after the death of his wife. He died on November 27, 1978

== See also ==
- Flat Tops Wilderness Area

== Sources ==
- Arthur Carhart Wilderness Training Center
- Arthur Carhart Papers, University of Iowa Libraries
- Arthur H. Carhart Papers, CONS88, Conservation Collection, The Denver Public Library.
- Contemporary Authors Online, Gale, 2008. Reproduced in Biography Resource Center. Farmington Hills, Mich.: Gale, 2008. Reproduced in Biography Resource Center Document Number: H1000015663.
- Superior National Forest - History
- Arthur Carhart: Wilderness prophet, by Tom Wolf (University Press of Colorado, 2008); ISBN 978-0-87081-913-1
