= Flat Top Mountain (Colorado) =

Mountain in Colorado, United States

Flattop Mountain
- Location within Colorado

Highest point
- Elevation: 12,361 ft (3,768 m)
- Prominence: 4,054 ft (1,236 m)
- Isolation: 40.77 mi (65.61 km)
- Listing: Colorado county high points 34th
- Coordinates: 40°00′53″N 107°05′00″W

Geography
- Location: High point of Garfield County, Colorado, United States
- Parent range: Highest summit of the Flat Tops
- Topo map(s): USGS 7.5' topographic map Orno Peak, Colorado

Climbing
- Easiest route: hike

Flat Top Mountain is the highest summit of the Flat Tops in the Rocky Mountains of North America. The prominent 12,361-foot (3,768 m) peak is located in the Flat Tops Wilderness, 19.1 miles (30.7 km) south-southwest (bearing 201°) of the Town of Oak Creek, Colorado, United States, on the drainage divide between Routt National Forest and White River National Forest. The summit of Flat Top Mountain is the highest point in Garfield County, Colorado.

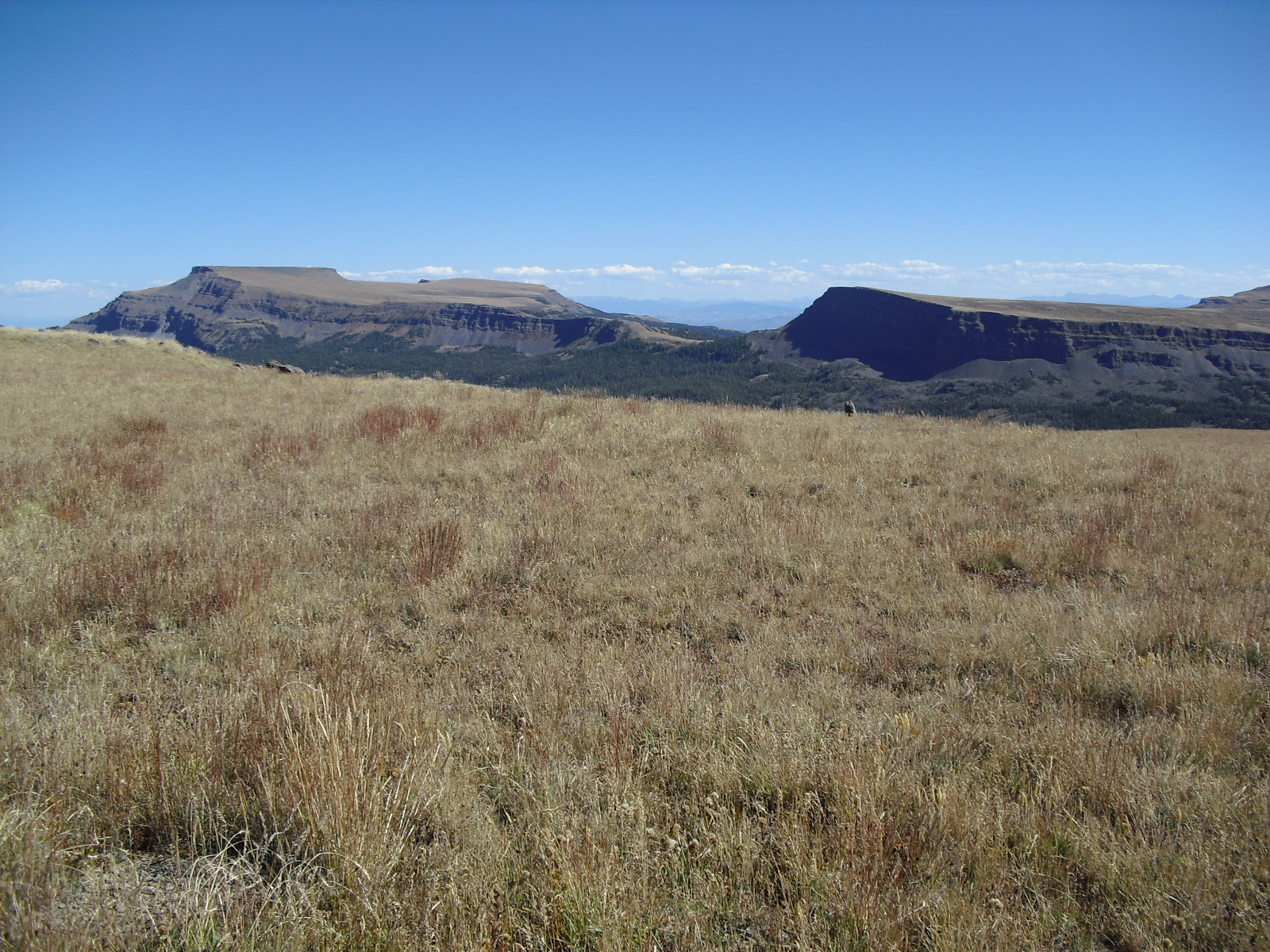
Flat Top Mountain (on the left) viewed from the plateau to the west

== Climate ==
Flat Top Mountain has a subalpine climate (Köppen Dfc), bordering on an alpine climate (ETH), with only one month averaging over 50 °F (10 °C).

Climate data for Flat Top Mountain 40.0068 N, 107.0827 W, Elevation: 12,080 ft (3,680 m) (1991–2020 normals)
Month	Jan	Feb	Mar	Apr	May	Jun	Jul	Aug	Sep	Oct	Nov	Dec	Year
Mean daily maximum °F (°C)	23.4 (−4.8)	23.9 (−4.5)	30.6 (−0.8)	35.8 (2.1)	44.7 (7.1)	56.1 (13.4)	62.5 (16.9)	60.5 (15.8)	53.5 (11.9)	41.8 (5.4)	30.3 (−0.9)	22.8 (−5.1)	40.5 (4.7)
Daily mean °F (°C)	13.2 (−10.4)	13.1 (−10.5)	18.8 (−7.3)	23.9 (−4.5)	32.9 (0.5)	43.5 (6.4)	50.4 (10.2)	48.4 (9.1)	41.4 (5.2)	30.8 (−0.7)	20.2 (−6.6)	13.0 (−10.6)	29.1 (−1.6)
Mean daily minimum °F (°C)	2.9 (−16.2)	2.4 (−16.4)	6.9 (−13.9)	11.9 (−11.2)	21.1 (−6.1)	30.9 (−0.6)	38.3 (3.5)	36.3 (2.4)	29.3 (−1.5)	19.8 (−6.8)	10.1 (−12.2)	3.3 (−15.9)	17.8 (−7.9)
Average precipitation inches (mm)	3.37 (86)	3.26 (83)	3.87 (98)	4.82 (122)	3.40 (86)	1.56 (40)	2.92 (74)	1.89 (48)	2.14 (54)	3.23 (82)	3.93 (100)	3.67 (93)	38.06 (966)
Source: PRISM Climate Group

== See also ==
- List of mountain peaks of Colorado
  - List of the most prominent summits of Colorado
  - List of Colorado county high points
