= Dörthe Tetzlaff =

German geologist

- Education: University of Freiburg; University of Hannover; University of Potsdam
- Scientific career
- Workplaces: University of Aberdeen; University of Hannover; Humboldt University of Berlin
- Thesis: Hydrologische Bewertung der Abflussdynamik in urbanen Gewässern (2003)

Dörthe Tetzlaff (born 1974, Magdeburg) is a German hydrologist who is Professor of Ecohydrology at Humboldt University zu Berlin and Head of Department at the Leibniz-Institute of Freshwater Ecology and Inland Fisheries, Berlin, Germany, since 2017. Tetzlaff was appointed Fellow of the Royal Society of Edinburgh in 2017, Fellow of the American Geophysical Union in 2018, Honorary Fellow of the Geological Society of America in 2019, Fellow of the European Academy of Sciences in 2022 and Member of the Berlin-Brandenburg Academy of Sciences and Humanities in 2023.

== Early life and education ==
Tetzlaff studied geography at the University of Potsdam. She moved to the Leibniz University of Hannover for graduate studies, where she earned a diploma in Landscape Ecology and Physical Geography. Her master's dissertation involved investigating runoff generation and groundwater recharge at Ripple Creek Pass. Tetzlaff moved to the University of Freiburg as a doctoral researcher, undertaking a hydrological assessment of flow dynamics in urban rivers. In her PhD, she performed an ecohydrological assessment of the impact of urbanisation on discharge regimes. After completing her doctorate, Tetzlaff was appointed as a postdoctoral research fellow at the University of Aberdeen. During her postdoc she became interested in aquatic ecohydrology, studying hydrological influences on the ecology of Atlantic salmon.

== Research and career ==
In 2007, Tetzlaff joined the faculty at the University of Aberdeen. She was promoted to Full Professor of Landscape Hydrology in 2010. Aberdeen awarded her a Doctor of Science in Hydrology in 2013.

Tetzlaff's research involves ecohydrology, the connection between rivers and landscapes, and stable isotope hydrology. The stable isotopes can be used to better understand waters; specifically to quantify the internal processes of water storage, transmission and release.

== Awards and honours ==
- 2017 Elected Fellow of the Royal Society of Edinburgh
- 2018 Elected Fellow of the American Geophysical Union
- 2019 Elected Honorary Fellow of the Geological Society of America
- 2020 Elected Fellow of the Geological Society of America

== Selected publications ==
- M. Hrachowitz; H.H.G. Savenije; G. Blöschl; et al. (August 2013). "A decade of Predictions in Ungauged Basins (PUB)—a review". Hydrological Sciences Journal. 58 (6): 1198–1255. doi:10.1080/02626667.2013.803183. ISSN 0262-6667. Wikidata Q28865146.
- L.J. Bracken; J. Wainwright; G.A. Ali; D. Tetzlaff; M.W. Smith; S.M. Reaney; A.G. Roy (April 2013). "Concepts of hydrological connectivity: Research approaches, pathways and future agendas". Earth-Science Reviews. 119: 17–34. Bibcode:2013ESRv..119...17B. doi:10.1016/j.earscirev.2013.02.001. ISSN 0012-8252. Wikidata Q59285976.
- J. J. McDonnell; K. McGuire; P. Aggarwal; et al. (11 May 2010). "How old is streamwater? Open questions in catchment transit time conceptualization, modelling and analysis". Hydrological Processes. 24 (12): 1745–1754. doi:10.1002/hyp.7796. ISSN 0885-6087. Wikidata Q57439748.
