= Flat Tops Wilderness Area =

Wilderness area in Colorado, United States

Flat Tops Wilderness
- IUCN category Ib (wilderness area)
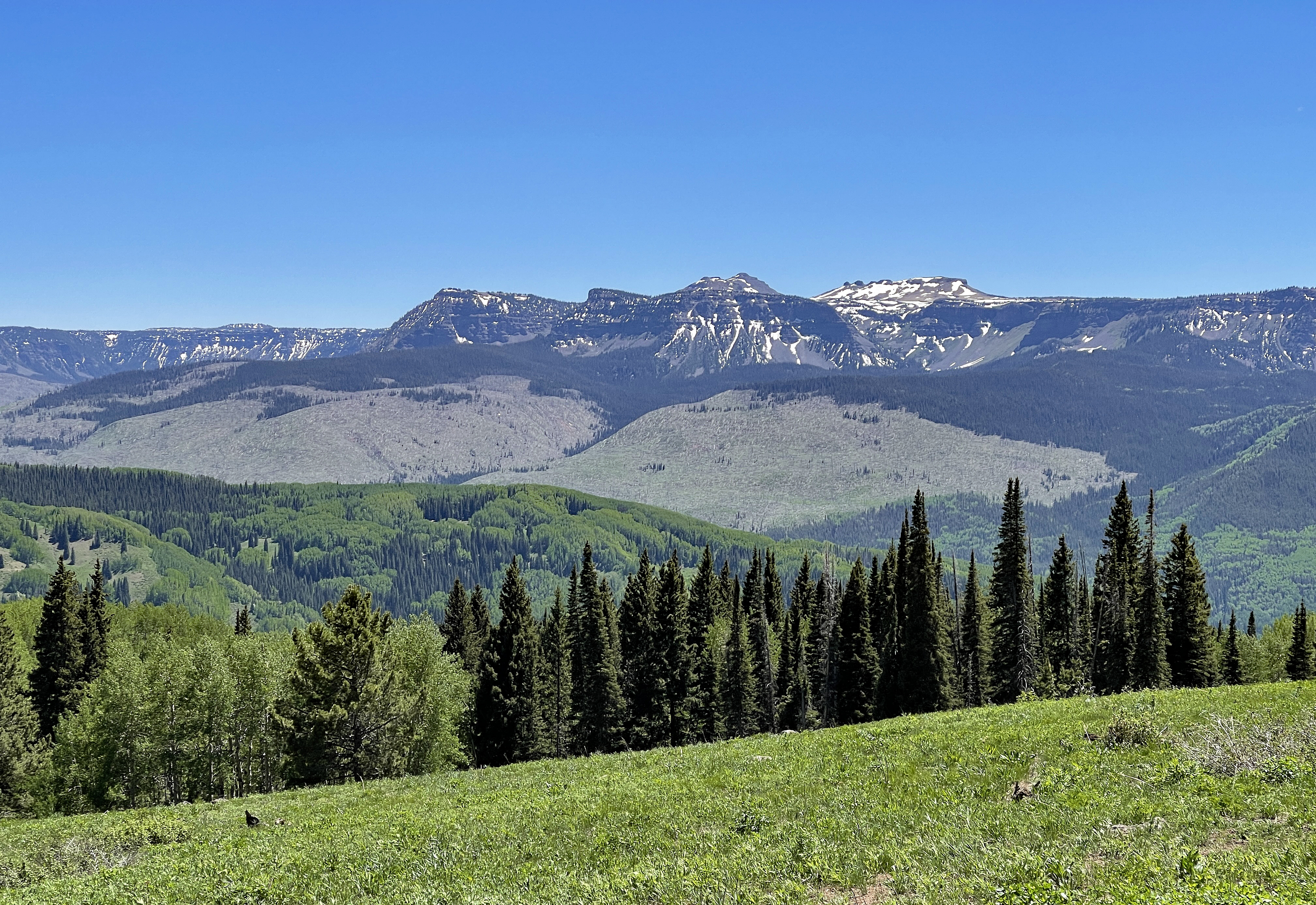
- The wilderness area from Ripple Creek Overlook

- Location within the United States
- Location: Garfield / Rio Blanco / Eagle counties, Colorado; United States
- Nearest city: Yampa, Colorado
- Coordinates: 39°56′56″N 107°15′58″W
- Area: 235,214 acres (951.88 km^{2})
- Established: January 1, 1975
- Governing body: United States Forest Service

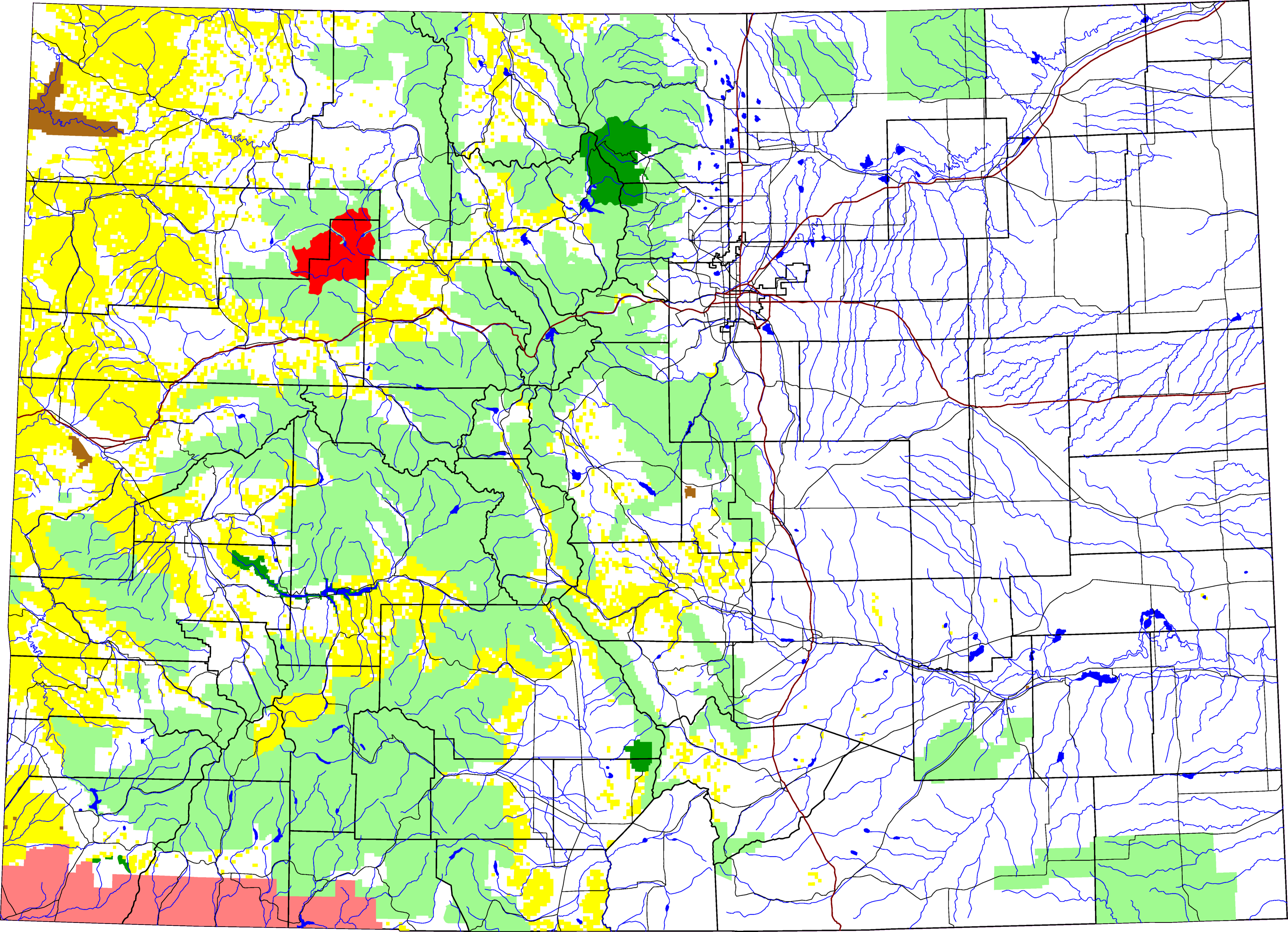
Flat Top Wilderness location is in red.

Flat Tops Wilderness Area is the third largest U.S. Wilderness Area in Colorado. It is 235,214 acres (951.88 km^{2}), with 38,870 acres (157.3 km^{2}) in Routt National Forest and 196,344 acres (794.58 km^{2}) in White River National Forest. It was designated a wilderness area in 1975. Trappers Lake, located in the north of the area, was the lake that inspired Arthur Carhart, a United States Forest Service official, to plead for wilderness preservation.

== Description ==
The dominant feature of the Wilderness is the high plateau from which the peaks arise. The plateau forms the northeastern portion of the White River Uplift capped by horizontal basalt flows from tertiary volcanic activity and is bounded by steep drops to valleys carved out by subsequent glaciation. The resulting mix of areas of treeless plateau at an elevation of 11,000 to 12,000 feet interspersed with verdant valleys is unique among Colorado mountain ranges. The area contains approximately one hundred and ten ponds and lakes and is home to a wide variety of plants and animals, including many large mammals such as moose, elk, mule deer, black bear, and cougars. This area has been affected by the non-native plant species, yellow toadflax. The most common trees are Engelmann spruce, subalpine fir and lodgepole pine, with aspen groves at lower elevations. The top of the plateau is alpine tundra.

The highest point in the Flat Tops is the summit of Flat Top Mountain (12,361 ft) on the east side of the range. The Devil's Causeway, perhaps the most popular geologic feature and hiking experience in the Flat Tops, is located in the same area. The Causeway is a narrow neck of the plateau where eroding glaciers on either side almost met. A trail crosses the Causeway which at its narrowest is 3 to 4 feet wide with drop-offs of hundreds of feet to the valleys on either side.

The eastern side of the Flat Tops Wilderness Area can be accessed by Routt County Rd 7 through the town of Yampa, Colorado. The best-known destination approached from the west side of the range is Trappers Lake.

== History ==
The Chief of the U.S. Forest Service designated 118,230 acres (47,850 ha) of the Routt and White River national forests as the Flat Tops Primitive Area on March 4, 1932, to be managed to protect the area's wild values.

Congress passed the Wilderness Act in 1964, which, among other things, required the Secretary of Agriculture to review the suitability of all primitive areas for inclusion into the national wilderness system within ten years. Following this mandate, the U.S. Forest Service evaluated the Flat Tops primitive area and surrounding forest and in 1967 recommended 142,230 acres for wilderness designation.

Conflict arose over the inclusion in the wilderness proposal of lands adjacent to the South Fork of the White River, near the southwest boundary of the proposed wilderness. Several private and public entities proposed dams and water diversions on the South Fork to facilitate development of rich oil shale deposits to the west. Timber interests also initially opposed designating wilderness outside the primitive area's boundary.

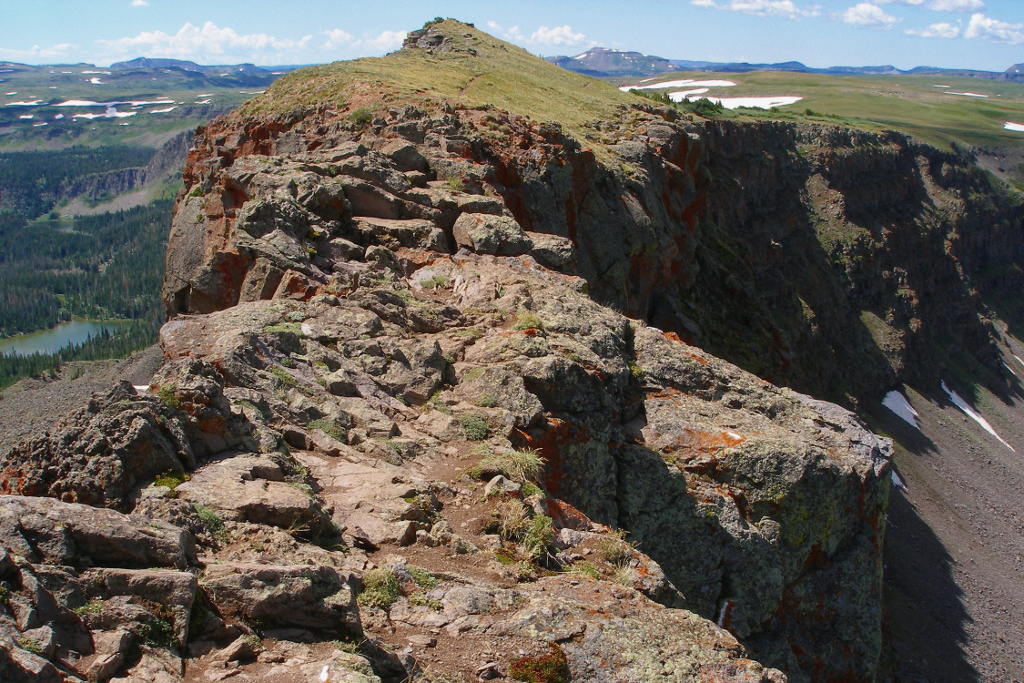
Devils Causeway ridgeline

Conservation groups, led by the Colorado Open Space Coordination Council and including Sierra Club, The Wilderness Society, Defenders of Wildlife, and the National Audubon Society, supported protecting a much larger, 230,000-acre area that included lower elevation forest and lakes outside the primitive area.

On June 5, 1975, the Senate passed a bill sponsored by U.S. Senator Floyd Haskell (D-Colo.) to designate 235,230 acres as the Flat Tops Wilderness Area. The bill passed the U.S. House of Representatives by a vote of 369–1 on December 1, 1975, and was signed into law by President Gerald R. Ford on December 12, 1975. The lands protected as wilderness included the contested lands along the South Fork of the White River, effectively prohibiting the contested dam construction there.

In August 2002 two lightning-struck fires, the Big Fish and Lost Lake fires, burned more than 22,500 acres, almost 10% of the Wilderness Area.

== See also ==
- List of U.S. Wilderness Areas
- Flat Tops (Colorado)
