= Yampa, Colorado =

Town in Routt County, Colorado, United States

- Town
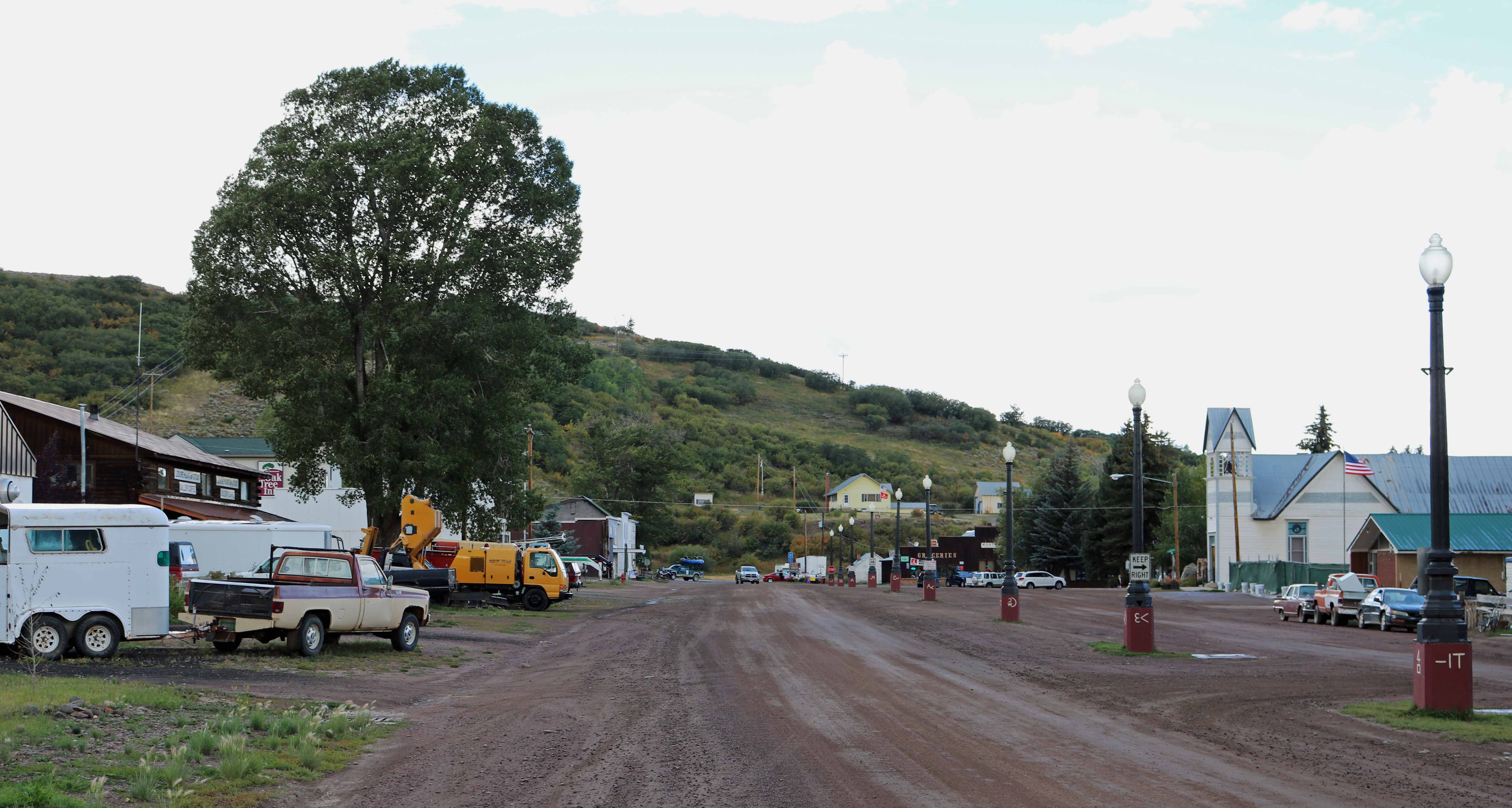
- Moffat Avenue in Yampa.

- Location of Yampa in Routt County, Colorado
- Coordinates: 40°09′11″N 106°54′31″W
- Country: United States
- State: Colorado
- County: Routt County
- Incorporated: February 25, 1907

Government
  - Type: Statutory Town

Area
  - Total: 0.24 sq mi (0.62 km^{2})
  - Land: 0.24 sq mi (0.62 km^{2})
  - Water: 0 sq mi (0.00 km^{2})
- Elevation: 7,878 ft (2,401 m)

Population (2020)
  - Total: 399
  - Density: 1,700/sq mi (640/km^{2})
- Time zone: UTC−7 (Mountain (MST))
  - Summer (DST): UTC−6 (MDT)
- ZIP code: 80483 (PO Box)
- Area code: 970
- FIPS code: 08-86475
- GNIS feature ID: 2413518
- Website: www.townofyampa.com

Yampa is a statutory town in Routt County, Colorado, United States. The population was 399 at the 2020 census.

== City name ==
Yampa is the Northern Ute word for the Perideridia root, which was an important food source.

== Geography ==
According to the United States Census Bureau, the town has a total area of 0.2 square miles (0.52 km^{2}), all of it land. It can be accessed by Colorado State Highway 131.

=== Climate ===
Yampa has a humid continental climate (Köppen climate classification Dfb), with warm summers and long, cold, snowy winters. Due to altitude and dryness, the diurnal temperature variation is large throughout the year, especially in summer, and the growing season is short, typically averaging just 80 days.

Climate data for Yampa, Colorado, 1991–2020 normals, extremes 1941–present
Month	Jan	Feb	Mar	Apr	May	Jun	Jul	Aug	Sep	Oct	Nov	Dec	Year
Record high °F (°C)	55 (13)	57 (14)	68 (20)	73 (23)	85 (29)	90 (32)	96 (36)	89 (32)	88 (31)	79 (26)	69 (21)	61 (16)	96 (36)
Mean maximum °F (°C)	43.9 (6.6)	48.2 (9.0)	57.6 (14.2)	67.7 (19.8)	75.7 (24.3)	82.4 (28.0)	86.4 (30.2)	84.3 (29.1)	80.8 (27.1)	72.3 (22.4)	59.0 (15.0)	47.3 (8.5)	86.8 (30.4)
Mean daily maximum °F (°C)	31.6 (−0.2)	34.5 (1.4)	43.2 (6.2)	52.0 (11.1)	62.2 (16.8)	73.5 (23.1)	79.4 (26.3)	77.5 (25.3)	70.4 (21.3)	57.2 (14.0)	42.3 (5.7)	31.7 (−0.2)	54.6 (12.6)
Daily mean °F (°C)	19.4 (−7.0)	21.5 (−5.8)	30.0 (−1.1)	38.1 (3.4)	47.4 (8.6)	56.7 (13.7)	63.0 (17.2)	61.3 (16.3)	53.8 (12.1)	41.9 (5.5)	29.6 (−1.3)	20.0 (−6.7)	40.2 (4.6)
Mean daily minimum °F (°C)	7.2 (−13.8)	8.5 (−13.1)	16.9 (−8.4)	24.2 (−4.3)	32.5 (0.3)	39.9 (4.4)	46.5 (8.1)	45.0 (7.2)	37.1 (2.8)	26.7 (−2.9)	17.0 (−8.3)	8.4 (−13.1)	25.8 (−3.4)
Mean minimum °F (°C)	−13.8 (−25.4)	−11.8 (−24.3)	−2.9 (−19.4)	8.0 (−13.3)	19.1 (−7.2)	28.9 (−1.7)	37.6 (3.1)	36.2 (2.3)	23.4 (−4.8)	10.0 (−12.2)	−4.6 (−20.3)	−13.7 (−25.4)	−18.7 (−28.2)
Record low °F (°C)	−47 (−44)	−35 (−37)	−24 (−31)	−10 (−23)	5 (−15)	13 (−11)	29 (−2)	24 (−4)	12 (−11)	−8 (−22)	−25 (−32)	−36 (−38)	−47 (−44)
Average precipitation inches (mm)	1.37 (35)	1.29 (33)	1.32 (34)	1.82 (46)	1.62 (41)	1.11 (28)	1.62 (41)	1.59 (40)	1.48 (38)	1.26 (32)	1.19 (30)	1.27 (32)	16.94 (430)
Average snowfall inches (cm)	26.1 (66)	21.3 (54)	16.8 (43)	15.5 (39)	4.7 (12)	0.5 (1.3)	0.0 (0.0)	0.0 (0.0)	0.6 (1.5)	6.9 (18)	17.4 (44)	21.4 (54)	131.2 (332.8)
Average extreme snow depth inches (cm)	16.2 (41)	19.7 (50)	17.0 (43)	7.4 (19)	2.9 (7.4)	0.3 (0.76)	0.0 (0.0)	0.0 (0.0)	0.4 (1.0)	3.2 (8.1)	7.5 (19)	11.7 (30)	21.0 (53)
Average precipitation days (≥ 0.01 in)	11.9	11.1	9.9	10.9	10.2	6.9	9.8	10.8	9.0	8.0	9.4	10.9	118.8
Average snowy days (≥ 0.1 in)	12.0	11.0	9.0	6.9	2.3	0.3	0.0	0.0	0.4	3.3	8.3	10.9	64.4
Source 1: NOAA
Source 2: National Weather Service

== Demographics ==
Historical population
Census	Pop.	Note	%±
1910	332		—
1920	200		−39.8%
1930	310		55.0%
1940	426		37.4%
1950	421		−1.2%
1960	312		−25.9%
1970	286		−8.3%
1980	472		65.0%
1990	317		−32.8%
2000	443		39.7%
2010	429		−3.2%
2020	399		−7.0%

As of the census of 2000, there were 443 people, 187 households, and 121 families residing in the town. The population density was 1,916.7 inhabitants per square mile (740.0/km^{2}). There were 211 housing units at an average density of 912.9 per square mile (352.5/km^{2}). The racial makeup of the town was 96.39% White, 0.23% African American, 1.13% Native American, 0.23% Pacific Islander, 0.90% from other races, and 1.13% from two or more races. Hispanic or Latino of any race were 4.51% of the population.

There were 187 households, out of which 35.3% had children under the age of 18 living with them, 55.1% were married couples living together, 5.3% had a female householder with no husband present, and 34.8% were non-families. 29.4% of all households were made up of individuals, and 5.9% had someone living alone who was 65 years of age or older. The average household size was 2.37 and the average family size was 2.94.

In the town, the population was spread out, with 26.4% under the age of 18, 6.8% from 18 to 24, 28.7% from 25 to 44, 30.5% from 45 to 64, and 7.7% who were 65 years of age or older. The median age was 38 years. For every 100 females, there were 118.2 males. For every 100 females age 18 and over, there were 118.8 males.

The median income for a household in the town was $37,500, and the median income for a family was $45,000. Males had a median income of $37,000 versus $20,625 for females. The per capita income for the town was $21,141. About 5.7% of families and 8.4% of the population were below the poverty line, including 7.6% of those under age 18 and 10.3% of those age 65 or over.

== Education ==
The community is in the South Routt School District RE-3.

== See also ==
- List of municipalities in Colorado
