= Dime =

DIME, Dime or Dimes may refer to:

== Coins ==
- Dime (United States coin), a ten-cent coin and subunit of US dollar
- Dime (Canadian coin), a ten-cent coin

== Acronyms (DIME) ==
- Dark Internet Mail Environment
- Dense inert metal explosive
- Detroit Institute of Music Education
  - DIME Denver, a branch of the Detroit Institute of Music Education
- DIME (diplomacy, information, military and economic) — concept of instruments of national power
- Direct Internet Message Encapsulation
- Distributed Internet Measurements and Simulations, DIMES
- Dropping in a Microgravity Environment
- Dual Independent Map Encoding

== Banks ==
- Dime Community Bank, in Brooklyn, New York
- Dime Bank Building, Scranton, Pennsylvania
- Dime Savings and Trust Company, a historic bank building in Allenstown, Pennsylvania
- Dime Savings Bank (disambiguation), various banks

== Music ==
- The Dimes, an American musical group
- Dime (album), an album by Guardian
- Dimes, an album by Deporitaz
- "Dime" (Beth song)
- "Dime" (Ivy Queen song)
- "Dime" (Pitbull song), a song by Pitbull featuring Ken-Y
- "Dime", a 1978 song by Rubén Blades and Willie Colón from Siembra
- "Dime", a 1985 song by Timbiriche from Timbiriche Rock Show
- "Dime", a 1988 sing by Selena y Los Dinos from Dulce Amor
- "Dime", a 1990 song by Jerry Rivera from Abriendo Puertas
- "Dime", a 2015 song by Karol G
- "Dime", a 2025 song by Sombr from I Barely Know Her

== Places ==
- Dime Box, Texas, an unincorporated community in Lee County

== Sports ==
- Dime defense, an American football defensive scheme
- Dime Magazine, an American basketball magazine

== People ==
Surname

- James Dime (1897–1981), Yugoslavian-American professional boxer and actor
- Albert Dimes (1914–1972), Scottish-born London criminal

Given name

- Dime Jankulovski (born 1977), Swedish former football goalkeeper of Macedonian descent
- Dime Spasov (born 1985), Macedonian politician
- Dime Tasovski (born 1980), Macedonian professional basketball player

Nickname

- Dimebag Darrell (born Darrell Lance Abbott, 1966–2004), American heavy metal guitarist

== See also ==
- Dime bar, a chocolate bar
- Dime language, the language of the Dime people of Ethiopia
- Dime museum, institutions that were popular at the end of the 19th century in the United States
- Dime novel, a type of popular fiction
  - Dime Western, Western-themed dime novels, which spanned the era of the 1860s–1900s
- Dime Store (Portland, Oregon), a short-lived restaurant in Portland, Oregon
- Dime Tabernacle, a Seventh-day Adventist church in Battle Creek, Michigan
