= Elizabeth Opila =

American materials scientist

Elizabeth J. Opila
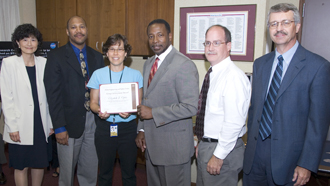
- Opila receives 2007 NASA Safety Engineering Center Group Achievement Award. Left to right, Jih Fen-Lei, Derrick Cheston, Opila, Woodrow Whitlow Jr., Dennis Fox, Gary Seng
- Education: University of Virginia; University of California, Berkeley; Massachusetts Institute of Technology
- Scientific career
- Workplaces: University of Illinois at Urbana-Champaign
- Thesis: The oxygen defect chemistry of La2-xSrxCuO4 (1991)

Elizabeth Jane Opila is an American materials scientist who is the Rolls-Royce Commonwealth Professor of Engineering at the University of Virginia. Her research considers the development of materials for extreme environments. She was elected Fellow of the Electrochemical Society in 2013 and the American Ceramic Society in 2014.

== Early life and education ==
Opila earned her bachelor's degree at the University of Illinois Urbana-Champaign, where she studied ceramic engineering. She moved to the University of California, Berkeley for graduate studies. Her master's research considered the surface diffusion of high temperature vapors in porous materials. She joined Massachusetts Institute of Technology as a doctoral researcher. Her doctoral research considered the chemistry of La_{2-x}Sr_{x}CuO_{4}, a high temperature superconductor. She joined the Glenn Research Center in 1991, where she worked on the shuttle program.

== Research and career ==
In 2010, Opila joined the University of Virginia as a professor of Materials Science. She leads the Rolls-Royce University Technology Center for Advanced Materials Systems. Opila studies ultra-high temperature ceramics, which are used in ball bearings, armor and aerospace. She is particularly interested in the development of materials that facilitate hypersonic travel. To investigate these materials, she creates lab-based experiments that can characterize materials properties at ultra high temperatures, flow rates and in the presence of reactive gases. Characterization involves spectroscopy, microscopy and chemical analysis (e.g. thermochemical properties and changes in weight).

Opila has worked on strategies to increase the temperature tolerances and efficiencies of turbine engine materials. This has involved holding contracts with NASA and the United States Department of Defense. Environmental barrier coatings can be used to protect ceramics from particulate matter and water vapor, but can corrode in sand, dust and volcanic ash. Opila developed coatings that allow niobium alloys to operature at 1,800 °C. These coatings serve to protect alloys from oxidising. The coatings are made of rare-earth oxides, specifically, high entropy rare earth oxides (HERO). HERO coatings protect the alloys from oxidizing and limit the build up of stress. Stress-build up is minimized by matching the thermal expansion of the coating with the underlying alloys, such that when they expand and contract during temperature changes they do so in the same directions/at the same rate. She combines computation modelling, artificial intelligence and quantum mechanics to identify the best candidates for HERO coatings.

Opila pioneered an undergraduate course on advanced ceramics in 2020.

== Selected publications ==
- Levine, Stanley R; Opila, Elizabeth J; Halbig, Michael C; Kiser, James D; Singh, Mrityunjay; Salem, Jonathan A (January 2002). "Evaluation of ultra-high temperature ceramics foraeropropulsion use". Journal of the European Ceramic Society. 22 (14–15): 2757–2767. doi:10.1016/s0955-2219(02)00140-1. ISSN 0955-2219.
- Opila, Elizabeth J.; Hann, Raiford E. (January 1997). "Paralinear Oxidation of CVD SiC in Water Vapor". Journal of the American Ceramic Society. 80 (1): 197–205. doi:10.1111/j.1151-2916.1997.tb02810.x. hdl:2060/19970022609. ISSN 0002-7820. S2CID 31102532.
- Opila, Elizabeth J.; Hann, Raiford E. (1997). "Paralinear Oxidation of CVD SiC in Water Vapor". Journal of the American Ceramic Society. 80 (1): 197–205. doi:10.1111/j.1151-2916.1997.tb02810.x. hdl:2060/19970022609. ISSN 0002-7820. S2CID 31102532.

== Awards and honors ==
- 2013 Elected Fellow of the Electrochemical Society
- 2014 Elected Fellow of the American Ceramic Society
- 2020 German Research Foundation Mercatur Fellow
- 2021 American Ceramic Society Arthur L. Friedberg Award
