= The Avengers (2012 film) =

Marvel Studios film

- Theatrical release poster
- Directed by: Joss Whedon
- Screenplay by: Joss Whedon
- Story by: Zak Penn; Joss Whedon
- Based on: Avengers by: Stan Lee; Jack Kirby
- Produced by: Kevin Feige
- Starring: Robert Downey Jr.; Chris Evans; Mark Ruffalo; Chris Hemsworth; Scarlett Johansson; Jeremy Renner; Tom Hiddleston; Stellan Skarsgård; Samuel L. Jackson
- Cinematography: Seamus McGarvey
- Edited by: Jeffrey Ford; Lisa Lassek
- Music by: Alan Silvestri
- Production company: Marvel Studios
- Distributed by: Walt Disney Studios Motion Pictures (Note: As part of the 2010 deal transferring the distribution rights of The Avengers and Iron Man 3 (2013) from Paramount Pictures to Walt Disney Studios Motion Pictures, Paramount received a residual associate credit ("in association with Paramount Pictures") in the film's credits and promotional materials and its logo appears in the film's opening titles alongside Marvel Studios.)
- Release dates: April 11, 2012 (El Capitan Theatre); May 4, 2012 (United States)
- Running time: 143 minutes
- Country: United States
- Language: English
- Budget: $220–225 million
- Box office: $1.520 billion

Marvel's The Avengers (titled Marvel Avengers Assemble in the United Kingdom and Ireland and commonly referred to as simply The Avengers) is a 2012 American superhero film based on the Marvel Comics superhero team the Avengers. Produced by Marvel Studios and distributed by Walt Disney Studios Motion Pictures, it is the sixth film in the Marvel Cinematic Universe (MCU). Written and directed by Joss Whedon, the film features an ensemble cast including Robert Downey Jr., Chris Evans, Mark Ruffalo, Chris Hemsworth, Scarlett Johansson, and Jeremy Renner as the Avengers, alongside Tom Hiddleston, Stellan Skarsgård, and Samuel L. Jackson. In the film, Nick Fury and the spy agency S.H.I.E.L.D. recruit Tony Stark, Steve Rogers, Bruce Banner, Thor, Natasha Romanoff, and Clint Barton to form a team capable of stopping Thor's brother Loki from subjugating Earth.

The film's development began when Marvel Studios received a loan from Merrill Lynch in April 2005. After the success of the film Iron Man in May 2008, Marvel announced that The Avengers would be released in July 2011 and would bring together Stark (Downey), Rogers (Evans), Thor (Hemsworth), and Banner (portrayed by Edward Norton in the 2008 film The Incredible Hulk) from Marvel's previous films. After the signing of Johansson as Romanoff in March 2009, Renner as Barton in June 2010, and Ruffalo to replace Norton as Banner in July 2010, the film was pushed back for a 2012 release. Whedon was hired in April 2010 and rewrote the original screenplay by Zak Penn. Production began in April 2011 in Albuquerque, New Mexico, before moving to Cleveland, Ohio, in August and New York City in September. The film has more than 2,200 visual effects shots.

The Avengers premiered at the El Capitan Theatre in Los Angeles on April 11, 2012, and was released in the United States on May 4, as the final film in Phase One of the MCU. The film received praise for Whedon's direction and screenplay, visual effects, action sequences, acting, and musical score. It grossed over $1.5 billion worldwide, setting numerous box office records and becoming the third-highest-grossing film of all time at the time of its release and the highest-grossing film of 2012. It was the first Marvel production to generate $1 billion in ticket sales. In 2017, The Avengers was featured as one of the 100 greatest films of all time in an Empire magazine poll. It received a nomination for Best Visual Effects at the 85th Academy Awards, among numerous other accolades. Three sequels have been released: Avengers: Age of Ultron (2015), Avengers: Infinity War (2018), and Avengers: Endgame (2019).

== Plot ==
The Asgardian Loki encounters the Other, the representative of an extraterrestrial race known as the Chitauri. In exchange for obtaining the Tesseract, (Note: Producer Kevin Feige stated that the Tesseract is based on the Cosmic Cube from the Marvel Comics. After Thor: The Dark World (2013), he stated that it was also the Space Stone.) a powerful energy source of unknown potential, the Other promises to provide Loki with an army to conquer Earth. Nick Fury, director of the covert agency S.H.I.E.L.D., arrives at a remote research facility where astrophysicist Dr. Erik Selvig is leading a team studying the Tesseract. It suddenly activates and opens a portal, allowing Loki to reach Earth. Loki steals the Tesseract and uses his scepter to enslave Selvig and other agents, including Clint Barton, to aid him.

In response, Fury reactivates the "Avengers Initiative". Agent Natasha Romanoff travels to Kolkata to recruit Dr. Bruce Banner so he can trace the Tesseract through its gamma radiation emissions. Fury approaches Steve Rogers to discuss his knowledge of the Tesseract, and Agent Phil Coulson visits Tony Stark so he can check Selvig's research. Loki is in Stuttgart, where Barton steals iridium needed to stabilize the Tesseract. This leads to a confrontation with Rogers, Stark, and Romanoff that ends with Loki's surrender. While Loki is being escorted to S.H.I.E.L.D., his adoptive brother Thor arrives and frees him, hoping to convince him to abandon his plan and return to Asgard. Stark and Rogers intervene, and Loki is imprisoned in S.H.I.E.L.D.'s flying base, the Helicarrier.

The Avengers disagree on how to approach Loki and become argumentative once they realize S.H.I.E.L.D. plans to use the Tesseract to create weapons of mass destruction to use against extraterrestrial threats. During the argument, Loki's agents attack the Helicarrier, and Banner transforms into the Hulk in the chaos. Stark and Rogers restart the damaged engine while Thor attempts to stop the Hulk's rampage. Romanoff subdues Barton, freeing him from Loki's control. Loki escapes after fatally wounding Coulson. Fury uses Coulson's subsequent death to motivate the Avengers to work together as a team. Loki uses the Tesseract and a generator Selvig built to open a portal above Stark Tower in New York City, allowing his Chitauri fleet to invade.

Rogers, Stark, Romanoff, Barton, Thor, and the Hulk work together to protect New York from the Chitauri. The Hulk incapacitates Loki while Romanoff learns from Selvig, now freed from Loki's mind control, that Loki's scepter can shut down the generator. Fury's superiors from the World Security Council attempt to end the invasion by launching a nuclear missile at Midtown Manhattan. Stark intercepts the missile and flies it toward the Chitauri fleet through the wormhole. The missile destroys the Chitauri mothership and disables their forces on Earth. Stark becomes unconscious, and his suit loses power, leaving him free falling towards Earth. The Hulk manages to catch him and the Avengers resuscitate him, while Romanoff uses Loki's scepter to close the wormhole. In the aftermath, Thor transports an imprisoned Loki and the Tesseract to Asgard, where Loki will face justice for his crimes.

In a mid-credits scene, the Other confers with his master (Note: Producer Kevin Feige confirmed that the "master" in the post-credits scene is Thanos.) about the failed attack on Earth.

== Cast ==
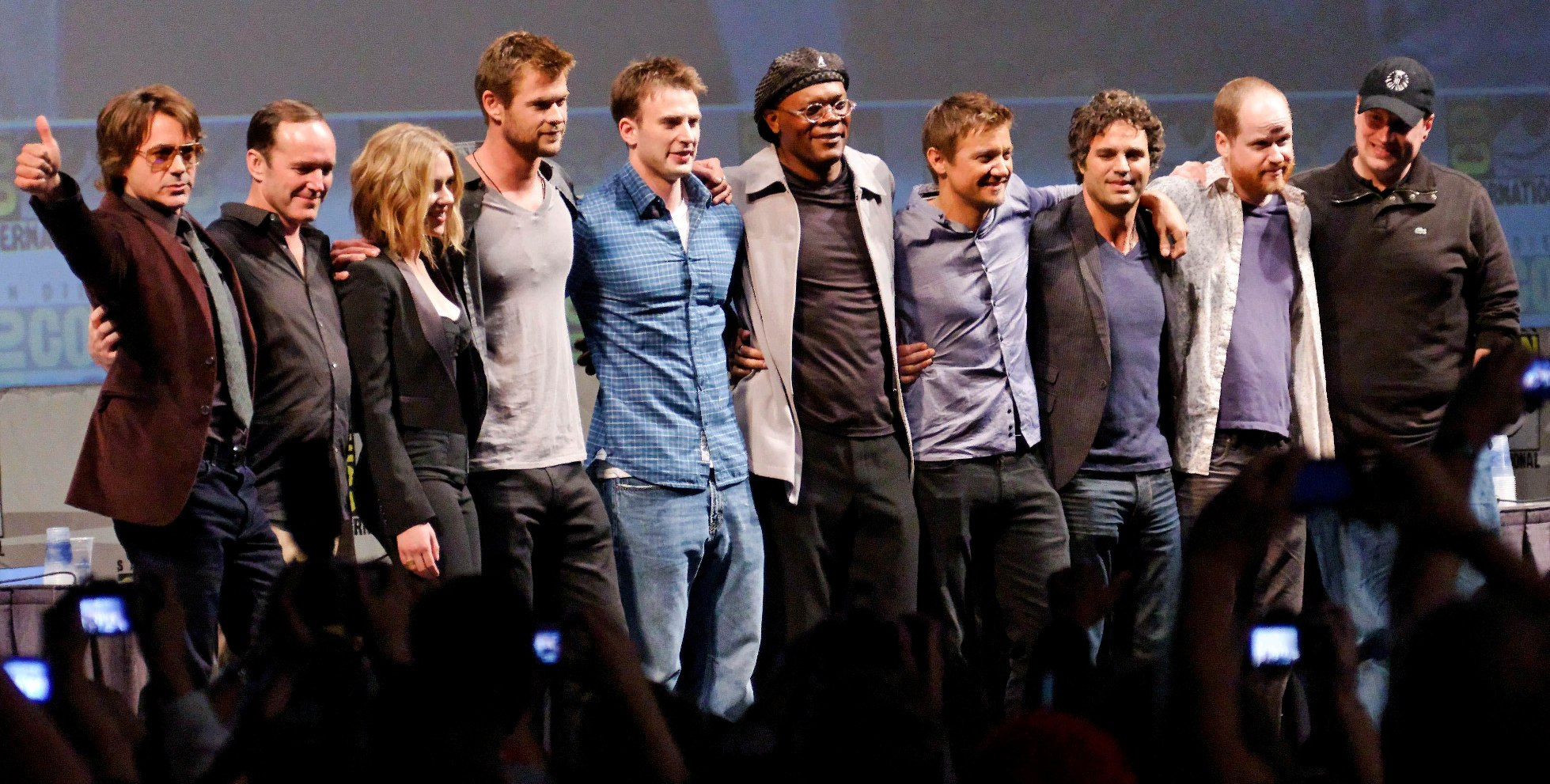
The cast of The Avengers alongside Joss Whedon and Kevin Feige at the 2010 San Diego Comic-Con.

- Robert Downey Jr. as Tony Stark / Iron Man:
  A self-described genius, billionaire, playboy, and philanthropist who wears an electromechanical suit of armor of his own invention. Downey was cast as part of his four-picture deal with Marvel Studios, which included Iron Man 2 (2010) and The Avengers. He initially suggested to Whedon that Stark should be the lead character, stating, "Well, I said, 'I need to be in the opening sequence. I don't know what you're thinking, but Tony needs to drive this thing.' He was like, 'Okay, let's try that.' We tried it and it didn't work, because this is a different sort of thing, the story and the idea and the theme is the theme, and everybody is just an arm of the octopus." Downey commented on the character's evolution, stating, "In Iron Man, which was an origin story, he was his own epiphany and redemption of sorts. Iron Man 2 is all about not being an island, dealing with legacy issues and making space for others. . . In The Avengers, he's throwing it down with the others". Downey earned $50 million from the film, "once box-office bonuses and backend compensation [were] factored in".
- Chris Evans as Steve Rogers / Captain America:
  A World War II veteran who was enhanced to the peak of human physicality by an experimental serum and frozen in suspended animation before waking up in the modern world. Evans was cast as part of a deal to star in three Marvel films, including The Avengers. Rogers is depicted as darker in The Avengers, with Evans stating, "It's just about him trying to come to terms with the modern world. You've got to imagine, it's enough of a shock to accept the fact that you're in a completely different time, but everybody you know is dead. Everybody you cared about. . . He was a soldier, obviously, everybody he went to battle with, all of his brothers in arms, they're all dead. He's just lonely. I think in the beginning it's a fish-out-of-water scene, and it's tough. It's a tough pill for him to swallow. Then comes trying to find a balance with the modern world." Evans also discussed the dynamic between Rogers and Tony Stark, saying, "I think there's certainly a dichotomy—this kind of friction between myself and Tony Stark, they're polar opposites. One guy is flash and spotlight and smooth, and the other guy is selfless and in the shadows and kind of quiet and they have to get along. They explore that, and it's pretty fun." Evans earned $2–3 million for the film.
- Mark Ruffalo as Bruce Banner / Hulk:
  A genius scientist who, due to exposure to gamma radiation, transforms into a monster when enraged or agitated. Ruffalo, initially considered for the role in The Incredible Hulk (2008) before Edward Norton took on the part, was cast after negotiations between Marvel and Norton fell through. Reflecting on replacing Norton, Ruffalo stated, "I'm a friend of Ed's, and yeah, that wasn't a great way for all that to go down. But the way I see it is that Ed has bequeathed this part to me. I look at it as my generation's Hamlet." Discussing the character, he explained, "He's a guy struggling with two sides of himself—the dark and the light—and everything he does in his life is filtered through issues of control. I grew up on the Bill Bixby TV series, which I thought was a really nuanced and real human way to look at the Hulk. I like that the part has those qualities." Ruffalo described the Hulk's role on the team, stating, "He's like the teammate none of them are sure they want on their team. He's a loose cannon. It's like, 'Just throw a grenade in the middle of the group and let's hope it turns out well!'" This is the first production in which the actor playing Banner also plays the Hulk. Ruffalo expressed excitement about the prospect, saying, "I'm really excited. No one's ever played the Hulk exactly; they've always done CGI. They're going to do the Avatar stop-action, stop-motion capture. So I'll actually play the Hulk. That'll be fun." The 3D model used to create the Hulk's body was based on Long Island bodybuilder and male stripper Steve Romm, while Ruffalo's face served as the model for the Hulk's facial features. To produce the Hulk's voice, Ruffalo's voice was combined with those of Lou Ferrigno and others; however, Ruffalo provided the Hulk's sole speaking line ("Puny god.") himself. Ruffalo earned $2–3 million for his role in the film.
- Chris Hemsworth as Thor:
  The crown prince of Asgard, based on the Norse mythological deity of the same name. Hemsworth was cast as part of a multiple movie deal. He had previously collaborated with Joss Whedon on The Cabin in the Woods (2011). Hemsworth maintained his physique from Thor (2011) by consuming a high-protein diet consisting of chicken breasts, fish, steak, and eggs daily. When asked about the quantity, he humorously replied, "My body weight in protein pretty much!" Thor's motivation in The Avengers is described by Hemsworth as personal, as it involves his brother's disruptive actions. He explained, "It's much more of a personal one, in the sense that it's his brother that is stirring things up. Whereas everyone else, it's some bad guy who they've gotta take down. It's a different approach for me, or for Thor. He's constantly having to battle the greater good and what he should do vs. it's his little brother there. . . I've been frustrated with my brothers at times, or family, but I'm the only one who is allowed to be angry at them. There's a bit of that." Hemsworth earned $2–3 million for his role in the film.
- Scarlett Johansson as Natasha Romanoff / Black Widow:
  A highly trained spy working for S.H.I.E.L.D. Johansson discussed her character's relationship with Hawkeye, stating, "Our characters have a long history. They've fought together for a long time in a lot of battles in many different countries. We're the two members of this avenging group who are skilled warriors – we have no superpowers. Black Widow is definitely one of the team, though. She's not in the cast simply to be a romantic foil or eye candy. She's there to fight, so I never felt like I was the only girl. We all have our various skills and it feels equal." Regarding her training for the role, Johansson mentioned, "Even though Iron Man 2 was 'one-for-them,' I'd never done anything like that before. I'd never been physically driven in something, or a part of something so big. For The Avengers, I've spent so many months training with our stunt team, and fighting all the other actors, it's crazy. I do nothing but fight—all the time." Johansson earned $4–6 million for her portrayal in the film.
- Jeremy Renner as Clint Barton / Hawkeye:
  A master archer working as an agent for S.H.I.E.L.D. Renner prepared for the physically demanding role by training extensively and practicing archery. He expressed his appreciation for Hawkeye's character, stating, "When I saw Iron Man, I thought that was a really kick-ass approach to superheroes. Then they told me about this Hawkeye character, and I liked how he wasn't really a superhero; he's just a guy with a high skill set. I could connect to that." Regarding Hawkeye's relationship with Natasha Romanoff, Renner explained, "It's a lonely game. He's an outcast. His only connection is to Scarlett's character, Natasha. It's like a left hand/right hand thing. They coexist, and you need them both, especially when it comes to a physical mission." Renner emphasized that Hawkeye is confident in his abilities and not insecure about his humanity, stating, "Quite the opposite, he's the only one who can really take down the Hulk with his [tranquilizer-tipped] arrows. He knows his limitations. But when it comes down to it, there has to be a sense of confidence in any superhero." Renner earned $2–3 million for his role in the film.
- Tom Hiddleston as Loki:
  Thor's adoptive brother and nemesis, based on the Norse mythological deity of the same name. Hiddleston reflected on his character's evolution from the film Thor, stating, "I think the Loki we see in The Avengers is further advanced. You have to ask yourself the question: How pleasant an experience is it disappearing into a wormhole that has been created by some kind of super nuclear explosion of his own making? So I think by the time Loki shows up in The Avengers, he's seen a few things." Regarding Loki's motivations, Hiddleston explained, "At the beginning of The Avengers, he comes to Earth to subjugate it and his idea is to rule the human race as their king. And like all the delusional autocrats of human history, he thinks this is a great idea because if everyone is busy worshipping him, there will be no wars so he will create some kind of world peace by ruling them as a tyrant. But he is also kind of deluded in the fact that he thinks unlimited power will give him self-respect, so I haven't let go of the fact that he is still motivated by this terrible jealousy and kind of spiritual desolation."
- Stellan Skarsgård as Erik Selvig:
  An astrophysicist and friend of Thor under Loki's control who is studying the Tesseract's power. Skarsgård commented on Loki's control over Selvig, stating, "Well with the scene we did in Thor, it was like Loki, one way or the other, entered Erik's mind. And in Avengers, you will see more clarity in how Loki is using Erik's mind." Regarding his role, he added, "[My character] is of importance but the size of the role is not big."
- Samuel L. Jackson as Nick Fury:
  The director of S.H.I.E.L.D. who was revealed in previous films to be coordinating the "Avengers Initiative". Jackson was brought to the project with a deal containing an option to play the character in up to nine Marvel films. Jackson expressed that he has a more significant role in The Avengers compared to previous films: "You don't have to wait until the end of the movie to see me". Reflecting on the role, Jackson stated, "It's always good to play somebody [who] is a positive in society as opposed to somebody who is a negative. . . I tried to make him as honest to the story and as honest to what real-life would seem." He likened the character to Ordell Robbie in Jackie Brown, describing him as "a nice guy to hang out with. You just don't want to cross him". Jackson earned $4–6 million for the film.

Clark Gregg appears as Phil Coulson, a S.H.I.E.L.D. agent overseeing many of the division's field operations. Gregg was cast as part of a multi-picture deal with Marvel. He noted that his role was expanded in The Avengers, expressing: "[What] Agent Coulson had become in terms of the import of this particular story, and how important his job is in bringing the Avengers together, it kind of felt a little surreal, like somebody was playing a prank and that wasn't the real script. But it wasn't, it was the real thing, I got to show up and do that stuff, and it felt like such an amazing payoff to what the journey had been and the fact I had been doing it for five years." Gregg said Whedon provided insight into his character's backstory, particularly about Coulson being a fan of Captain America. Cobie Smulders appears as Maria Hill, a high-ranking S.H.I.E.L.D. agent working closely with Nick Fury. Smulders, initially considered by Whedon for his unproduced live-action Wonder Woman film, was selected from a short list of potential actresses including Morena Baccarin. Her deal integrated her into nine films. Regarding her preparation, Smulders said, "I hired this amazing black-ops trainer to teach me how to hold a gun, take me to a shooting range, how to hit, how to hold myself, how to walk and basically how to look. I don't do a ton of fighting in the movie, which is why I wasn't offered a trainer, but I wanted to look like I had the ability to." On relating to the character, Smulders said, "I can relate to her being a mom and being a businesswoman and trying to work full-time and raising a family and having a career. We're asked to do a lot of things these days. I feel she is just all about her job and keeping things going."

Gwyneth Paltrow and Maximiliano Hernández reprise their roles as Pepper Potts and Jasper Sitwell, respectively, from previous MCU films. Paul Bettany returns to voice J.A.R.V.I.S. Frequent Whedon collaborator Alexis Denisof portrays "the Other", while Damion Poitier portrays his master, Thanos (unnamed in the film), in a post-credits scene. Powers Boothe and Jenny Agutter appear as members of the World Security Council, later revealed to be Gideon Malick and Councilwoman Hawley. Avengers co-creator Stan Lee makes a cameo appearance in a news report. Additionally, Harry Dean Stanton cameos as a security guard, and Polish film director Jerzy Skolimowski appears as Georgi Luchkov, Romanoff's interrogator. Warren Kole has a brief role as a S.H.I.E.L.D. bridge tech who is caught playing Galaga. Enver Gjokaj and Ashley Johnson, the former who would later play Daniel Sousa in the series Agent Carter (2015–2016), appear as a police officer and a waitress named Beth, respectively.

== Production ==
=== Development ===
"It goes back to the very first incarnation of The Avengers, it goes to The Ultimates, it goes to everything about it. It makes no sense, it's ridiculous. There's a thunder god, there's a green 'id' giant rage monster, there's Captain America from the 40s, there's Tony Stark who definitely doesn't get along with anybody. Ultimately these people don't belong together and the whole movie is about finding yourself from community. And finding that you not only belong together but you need each other, very much. Obviously this will be expressed through punching but it will be the heart of the film."

— Joss Whedon, director of The Avengers, about the film.

Ideas for a film based on the Avengers began in 2003, with Avi Arad, the CEO of Marvel Studios, first announcing plans to develop the film in April 2005, after Marvel Enterprises declared independence by allying with Merrill Lynch to produce a slate of films that would be distributed by Paramount Pictures. Marvel discussed their plans in a brief presentation to Wall Street analysts; the studio's intention was to release individual films for the main characters to establish their identities and familiarize audiences with them before merging the characters together in a crossover film. Screenwriter Zak Penn, who wrote The Incredible Hulk, became attached to the film in 2006, and was hired by Marvel Studios to write the film in June 2007. In the wake of the 2007–2008 Writers Guild of America strike, Marvel negotiated with the Writers Guild of America to ensure that it could create films based on its comic book counterparts, including Captain America, Ant-Man, and The Avengers. After the successful release of Iron Man (2008) in May, the company set a July 2011 release date for The Avengers. In September 2008, Marvel Studios reached an agreement with Paramount—an extension of a previous partnership—which gave the company distribution rights for five future Marvel films.

Casting began in October 2008 with Downey's signing. Although Don Cheadle was reported to reprise his Iron Man 2 role of War Machine for The Avengers, he later stated that he did not think the character would appear in the film. Simultaneously, two major developments occurred for Marvel: Jon Favreau was brought in as an executive producer for the film, and the company signed a long-term lease with Raleigh Studios to produce three other big-budget films—Iron Man 2, Thor, and Captain America: The First Avenger (2011)—at their Manhattan Beach, California complex. In February 2009, Samuel L. Jackson signed a nine-picture deal with Marvel Entertainment to play Nick Fury in Iron Man 2 and other films. In September 2009, Edward Norton, who played Bruce Banner in The Incredible Hulk, stated he was open to returning in the film. The next month, executive producer Jon Favreau stated he would not direct the film but would "definitely have input and a say". Favreau also expressed concerns, stating, "It's going to be hard, because I was so involved in creating the world of Iron Man, and Iron Man is very much a tech-based hero, and then with Avengers, you're going to be introducing some supernatural aspects because of Thor [...] [Mixing] the two of those works very well in the comic books, but it's going to take a lot of thoughtfulness to make that all work and not blow the reality that we've created". In March 2009, Scarlett Johansson replaced Emily Blunt in portraying Natasha Romanoff in Iron Man 2, a deal that subsequently attached her to The Avengers. The following day, Marvel announced that the film's release date had been pushed back to May 4, 2012, almost a full year later. Chris Hemsworth and Tom Hiddleston joined the film's cast in June, returning as Thor and Loki, respectively.

In July 2009, Penn discussed the crossover process, stating, "My job is to kind of shuttle between the different movies and make sure that finally we're mimicking that comic book structure where all of these movies are connected. . . There's just a board that tracks 'Here's where everything that happens in this movie overlaps with that movie'. . . I'm pushing them to do as many animatics as possible to animate the movie, to draw boards so that we're all working off the same visual ideas. But the exigencies of production take first priority". Initially, Penn attempted to reduce Thor's role in the script due to doubts about the character's ability to succeed on film. However, he changed his mind once Hemsworth was cast as Thor. Although the film always intended to use Loki as its villain, Penn noted that early discussions had considered using Red Skull.

In January 2010, Marvel Studios chief Kevin Feige was asked if it would be challenging to blend the fantasy of Thor with the high-tech science fiction in Iron Man and The Avengers. "No," he said, "because we're doing the Jack Kirby/Stan Lee/Walt Simonson/J. Michael Straczynski Thor. We're not doing the blow-the-dust-off-of-the-old-Norse-book-in-your-library Thor. And in the Thor of the Marvel Universe, there's a race called the Asgardians. And we're linked through this Tree of Life that we're unaware of. It's real science, but we don't know about it yet. The 'Thor' movie is about teaching people that". In March, it was reported that Penn had completed the first draft of the script, and that Marvel editor-in-chief Joe Quesada and Avengers comic-book writer Brian Michael Bendis had received copies. Also in March, Chris Evans accepted an offer to play Captain America in three films including The Avengers.

=== Pre-production ===
"People forget that we started filming Avengers before either Thor or Captain America were released. What if people hated Thor? What if people thought Loki was ridiculous? What if people didn't buy this super soldier frozen in ice? We were in the first quarter of production on a giant movie at that time, and we weren't going to stop. It was sort of all in at that point."

— Kevin Feige, President of Production for Marvel Studios, on the challenges of producing the first Avengers film.

By April 2010, Joss Whedon was nearing the completion of a deal to direct the film and to revise Penn's script, and was officially announced in July 2010. Regarding the hiring, Arad stated: "My personal opinion is that Joss will do a fantastic job. He loves these characters and is a fantastic writer [...] It's part of his life so you know he is going to protect it [...] I expect someone like him is going to make the script even better". Feige added, "I've known Joss for many years. We were looking for the right thing and he came in and met on it [...] we want[ed] to find a director that's on the verge of doing something great, as we think Joss is." Whedon stated at the 2010 San Diego Comic-Con that what drew him to the film is that he loves how "these people shouldn't be in the same room let alone on the same team—and that is the definition of family".

When Whedon received Penn's draft, he told Feige he felt the studio did not "have anything" and they should "pretend this draft never happened". Part of Whedon's issue was the lack of character connections in Penn's draft, which necessitated Whedon to begin "at square one". Whedon went on to write a five-page treatment of his plan for the film and created the tagline "Avengers: Some Assembly Required", riffing on the "Avengers Assemble" slogan from the comic books. Marvel quickly began working to sign Whedon to write and direct, only stipulating that he include the Avengers against Loki, a battle among the heroes in the middle, a battle against the villains at the end, and that he get the film done for its May 2012 release. The script went through "a lot of insane iterations of what might be", according to Whedon. There was a point when it was not certain Johansson would star in the film, so he "wrote a huge bunch of pages starring The Wasp", and wanted Zooey Deschanel to play the character. He also was "worried that one British character actor [(Hiddleston)] was not enough to take on Earth's mightiest heroes, and that we'd feel like we were rooting for the overdog. So I wrote a huge draft with Ezekiel Stane, Obadiah Stane's son, in it." Once all of the actors were "locked in place the movie stayed on mission." Whedon noted that the characters used do not have the same issue, unlike the X-Men. He felt "these guys just don't belong together" before realizing their interactions could be like The Dirty Dozen (1967). Whedon also referenced Dr. Strangelove (1964), The Abyss (1989), His Girl Friday (1940), and Black Hawk Down (2001). Whedon would ultimately share final screenplay credit with Penn, though Whedon noted he "fought" for sole credit and was "very upset about it." Penn felt the two "could have collaborated more, but that was not his choice. He wanted to do it his way, and I respect that."

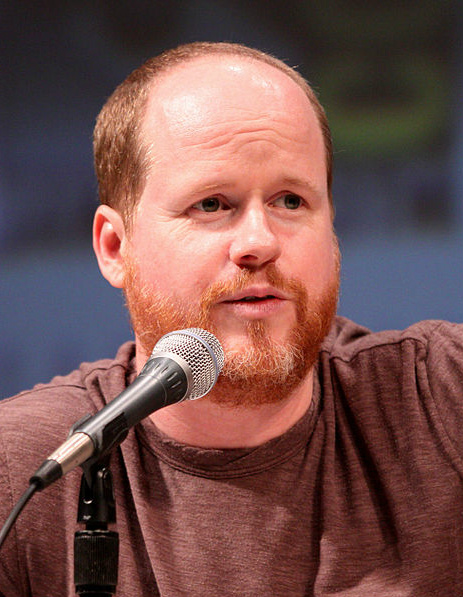
Joss Whedon at the 2010 San Diego Comic-Con

The casting process continued throughout much of 2010, with the additions of Jeremy Renner, Mark Ruffalo, and Clark Gregg. Ruffalo replaced Edward Norton, whom Marvel declined to bring back. "We have made the decision to not bring Ed Norton back to portray the title role of Bruce Banner in The Avengers," stated Feige. "Our decision is definitely not one based on monetary factors, but instead rooted in the need for an actor who embodies the creativity and collaborative spirit of our other talented cast members. The Avengers demands players who thrive working as part of an ensemble, as evidenced by Robert, Chris H, Chris E, Samuel, Scarlett, and all of our talented casts. We are looking to announce a name actor who fulfills these requirements, and is passionate about the iconic role in the coming weeks." In response, Norton's agent Brian Swardstrom decried Feige's statement, calling it "purposefully misleading" and an "inappropriate attempt to paint our client in a negative light". In October 2014, Norton claimed it was his own decision never to play Hulk again because he "wanted more diversity" with his career and did not want to be associated with only one character.

In August 2010, it was reported that Paramount Pictures and Marvel Studios were planning to start shooting in February. In October 2010, Grumman Studios in Bethpage, New York and the Steiner Studios in Brooklyn, New York City, were announced as filming locations, with set construction slated to begin in November, but as Whedon later explained, "Originally we were supposed to be in Los Angeles, then for a short period we were supposed to be in New York, and then somehow we ended up in Albuquerque." Also that October, Walt Disney Studios agreed to pay Paramount at least $115 million for the worldwide distribution rights to Iron Man 3 (2013) and The Avengers. The deal also allowed Paramount to continue to collect the 8 percent box office fee it would have earned for distributing the film and a marquee credit—placement of the company's production logo on marketing materials and the film's opening titles. As a result, the onscreen production credit reads "Marvel Studios presents in association with Paramount Pictures", though the film is solely owned, distributed, financed, and marketed by Disney. Paramount's Epix retained pay TV rights.

In December 2010, Governor of New Mexico Bill Richardson and Marvel Studios Co-president Louis D'Esposito announced that The Avengers would primarily film in Albuquerque, New Mexico, with principal photography scheduled for April through September 2011. Parts of the film were also slated to be shot in Michigan, but plans to film in Detroit were scrapped after Governor Rick Snyder proposed a budget that would eliminate a film tax incentive. Three months later, in March, Governor of Ohio John Kasich announced during Mayor Frank G. Jackson's State of the City address that The Avengers would also film in Cleveland.

Concept illustrator and designer of Iron Man's Mark VII armor, Phil Saunders, stated that "Joss Whedon was looking for something that had the 'cool' factor of the suitcase suit [from Iron Man 2], while still being a fully armored, heavy-duty suit that could take on an army in the final battle." To achieve this, Saunders combined ideas proposed in Iron Man 2 with some concepts abandoned in the first Iron Man film, creating a modular suit featuring large ammo packets on the arms and a backpack. Additionally, the Science & Entertainment Exchange provided science consultation for the film.

Casting reached its final stages the following year. In February 2011, Cobie Smulders was cast in the role of Maria Hill, after participating in screen tests conducted by Marvel for the role of a key S.H.I.E.L.D. member, whom Samuel L. Jackson described as Nick Fury's sidekick. Morena Baccarin, Jessica Lucas, and Mary Elizabeth Winstead were also considered for the role. Over the successive months, the film's cast expanded to include Stellan Skarsgård, Paul Bettany, and Gwyneth Paltrow. Paltrow was cast at Downey's insistence; prior to this, Whedon had not intended the film to include supporting characters from the heroes' individual films, commenting, "You need to separate the characters from their support systems in order to create the isolation you need for a team."

=== Filming ===
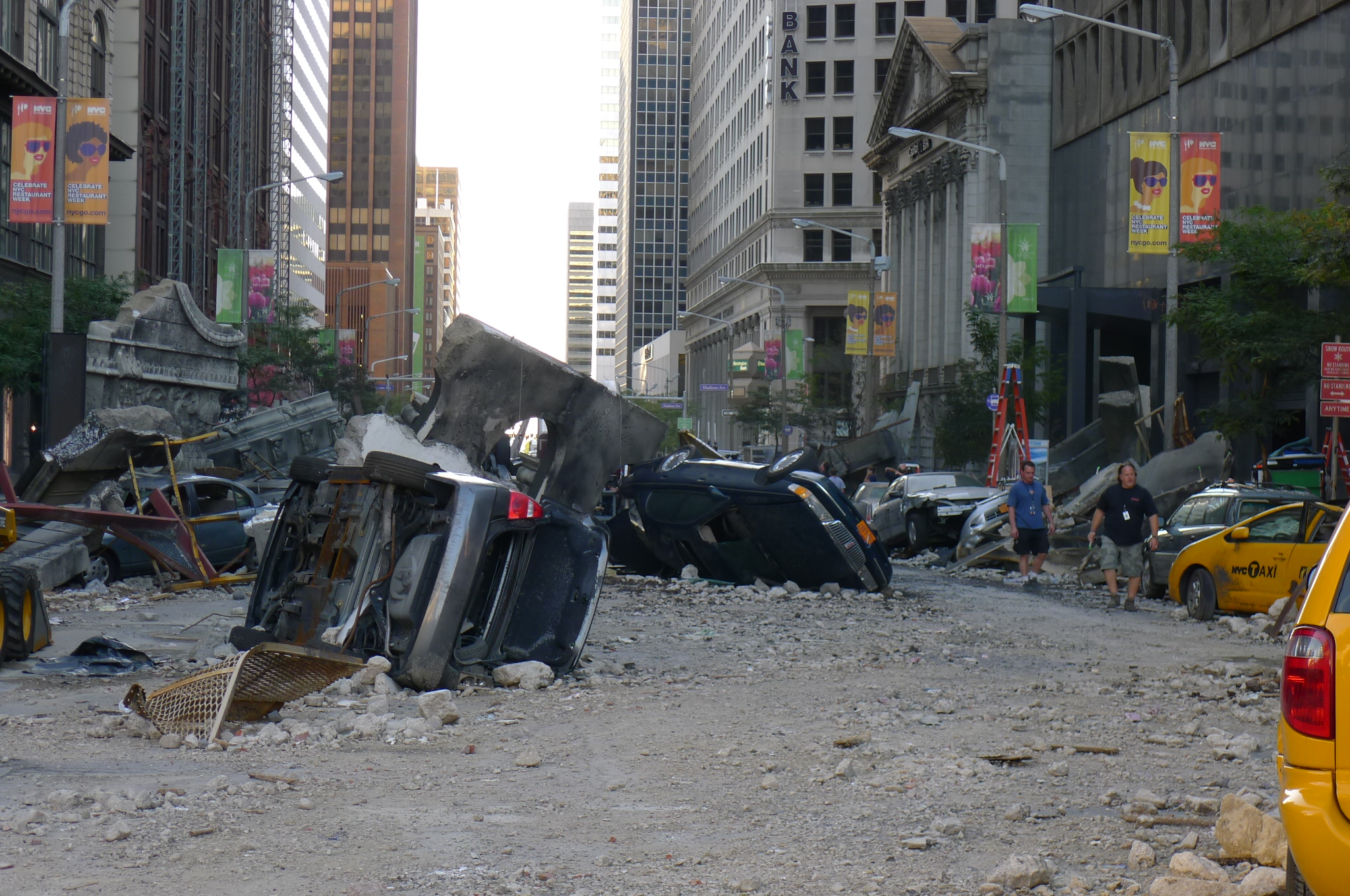
Part of The Avengers film set on East 9th Street in Cleveland, Ohio

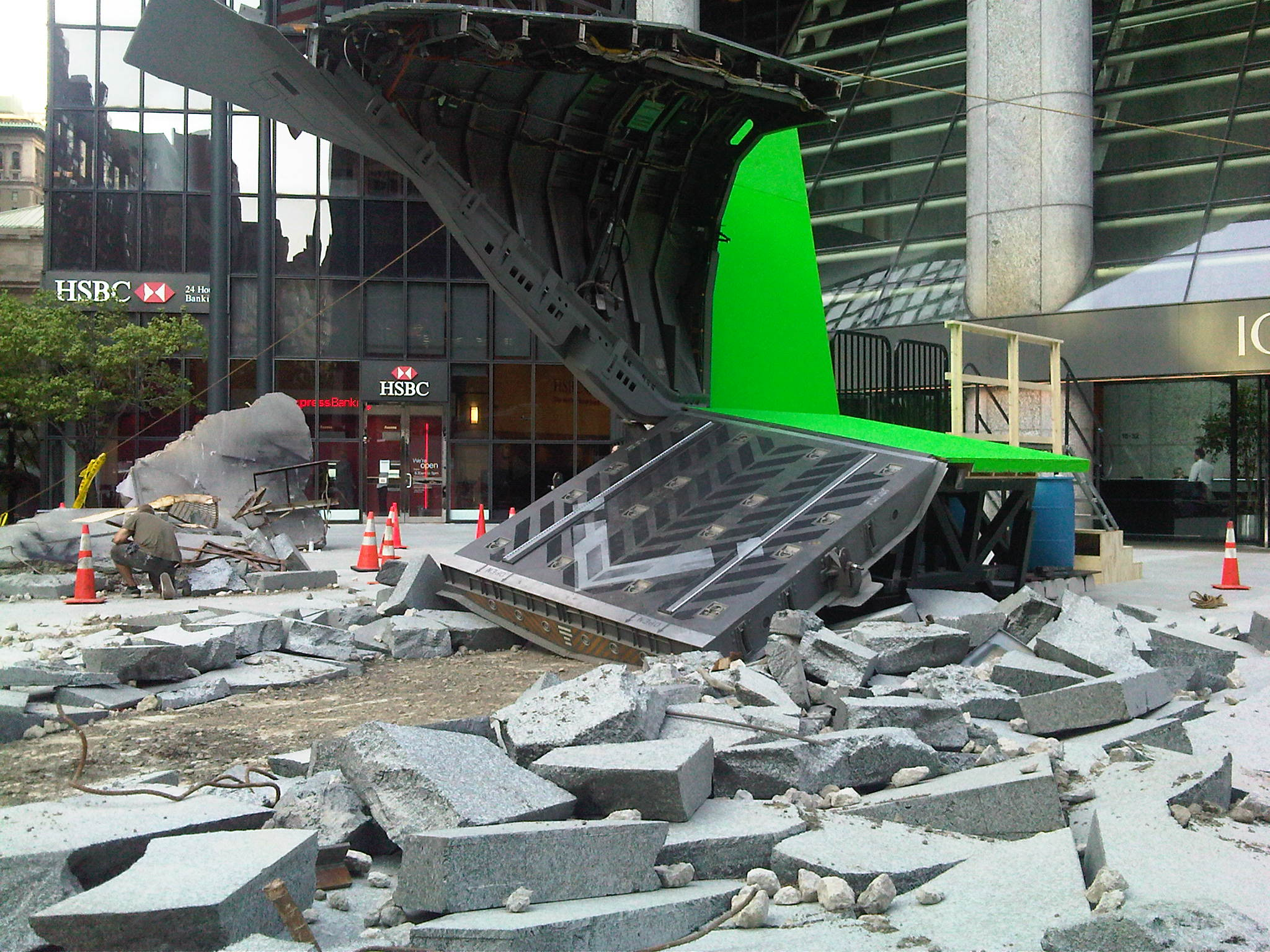
Part of The Avengers film set on Park Avenue in New York City

Principal photography began on April 25, 2011, at Albuquerque Studios in Albuquerque, New Mexico, with the working title Group Hug. In June 2011, stuntman Jeremy Fitzgerald sustained a head injury while attempting a stunt involving a 30-foot fall from a building after being struck by an arrow. Despite the injury, Fitzgerald recovered and resumed work on set, as confirmed by a Marvel spokesperson to TMZ. Second unit filming occurred in the Butler area, about an hour outside Pittsburgh, Pennsylvania, the following month. Additionally, a chase sequence was shot in Worthington, Pennsylvania, at Creekside Mushroom Farms, which provided 150 miles of abandoned limestone tunnels 300 feet below the ground for filming.

Production shifted to Cleveland, Ohio in August 2011, where filming spanned four weeks. The city's East 9th Street was selected as a stand-in for New York City's 42nd Street, serving as the backdrop for climactic battle scenes. Army Reserve soldiers from the 391st Military Police Battalion, based in Columbus, Ohio, participated in the background action during the battle scenes in Cleveland. Staff Sergeant Michael T. Landis noted that the involvement of real soldiers enhanced the realism of the scenes and portrayed the military positively, citing their ability to provide on-the-spot corrections to tactics and uniforms. The NASA Plum Brook Station near Sandusky, Ohio, specifically its Space Power Facility, doubled as a S.H.I.E.L.D. research facility. Filming also occurred at the Chevrolet powertrain plant in Parma, Ohio, where a series of explosions were captured for the battle sequence originating in Cleveland. Additional scenes were shot at Public Square and the Detroit–Superior Bridge, with Public Square's southwest quadrant transformed into Stuttgart, Germany for filming. Principal photography concluded in New York City, where filming took place over a span of two days. Filming locations included Park Avenue and Central Park. To capture scenes set in Manhattan, visual effects supervisor Jake Morrison spent over three days shooting aerial footage to use as background plates. Morrison emphasized the importance of incorporating real imagery into the effects work to enhance realism, stating, "There is no substitute for starting with a real image and adding what you need."

Cinematographer Seamus McGarvey explained that he chose a 1.85:1 aspect ratio to accommodate the varying heights of the main characters. He said, "Shooting 1.85:1 is kind of unusual for an epic film like this, but we needed the height in the screen to be able to frame in all the characters like Hulk, Captain America and Black Widow, who is much smaller. We had to give them all precedence and width within the frame. Also, Joss [Whedon] knew the final battle sequence was going to be this extravaganza in Manhattan, so the height and vertical scale of the buildings was going to be really important." This film marked McGarvey's first experience using a digital camera, specifically the Arri Alexa. Additionally, the Canon EOS 5D Mark II and Canon EOS 7D digital SLR cameras were employed for certain shots, while high-speed shots were captured on 35 mm film using the Arriflex 435. McGarvey emphasized a visual approach focused on immersion and naturalism, stating, "Joss and I were keen on having a very visceral and naturalistic quality to the image. We wanted this to feel immersive and did not want a 'comic book look' that might distance an audience with the engagement of the film. We moved the camera a lot on Steadicam, cranes and on dollies to create kinetic images; and we chose angles that were dramatic, like low angles for heroic imagery."

=== Post-production ===
In December 2011, Disney announced the film would undergo a conversion to 3D. According to Whedon, "I'm not a big fan of extreme long lens, talky movies – I like to see the space I'm in and relate to it, so 3D kinda fits my aesthetic anyway. And the technology has advanced so far in the past couple years." Whedon also noted, "there definitely are movies that shouldn't be in 3D", but stated, "The Avengers isn't obnoxiously 3D. There's no, 'Oh look, we're going to spend 20 minutes going through this tunnel because it's in 3D!' And no one is pointing at the screen the entire time. But it's an action movie. Things tend to hurtle toward the screen anyway." In January 2012, it was reported that the film would undergo digital remastering for IMAX 3D and would open in IMAX theaters on May 4, 2012, the same day as its regular theater release. This IMAX release followed Marvel's earlier IMAX releases of Iron Man 2 and Thor. When The Avengers was initially submitted to the Motion Picture Association of America's rating board, the film received an R rating due to Phil Coulson's death scene. The scene was subsequently edited to secure a PG-13 rating.

In a May 2012 interview, Whedon revealed that it was his decision to include Thanos in a post-credits scene, even though the character is not identified in the film. "He for me is the most powerful and fascinating Marvel villain. He's the great grand daddy of the badasses and he's in love with Death and I just think that's so cute. For me, the greatest Avengers [comic book] was Avengers Annual #7 (1977) that Jim Starlin did followed by Marvel Two-in-One Annual #2 (1977) that contained the death of Adam Warlock. Those were some of the most important texts and I think underrated milestones in Marvel history and Thanos is all over that, so somebody had to be in control and had to be behind Loki's work and I was like 'It's got to be Thanos.' And they said 'Okay' and I'm like 'Oh my God!'" Additionally, an extra scene featuring the Avengers enjoying shawarma was filmed on April 12, 2012, a day after the world premiere. Evans wore a prosthetic jaw during the scene to conceal the beard he had grown. Following the film's release, shawarma sales in Los Angeles, St. Louis, and Boston reportedly saw a significant surge. Whedon explained that the inspiration for the shawarma scene came from the aftermath of filming a scene in the Angel episode "A Hole in the World" where Fred dies in Wesley's arms. After filming, Whedon, along with actors Amy Acker and Denisof, who played Fred and Wesley respectively, "went out for drinks and ended up just sitting around quietly, exhausted from the day's events", an experience that Whedon recreated in the film's scene.

Mark Ruffalo as the Hulk (bottom) wearing a motion capture suit and prosthetics on his upper half to emulate the Hulk's size

The film features over 2,200 visual effects shots completed by 14 companies: Industrial Light & Magic (ILM), Weta Digital, Scanline VFX, Hydraulx, Fuel VFX, Evil Eye Pictures, Luma Pictures, Cantina Creative, Trixter, Modus FX, Whiskytree, Digital Domain, The Third Floor, and Method Design. ILM was the lead vendor and shared responsibility for creating many of the film's key effects, including the Helicarrier, the New York cityscape, digital body doubles, Iron Man, and the Hulk. To bring the Hulk to life on screen, Ruffalo performed in a motion-capture suit on set alongside the other actors, while four motion-capture HD cameras (two capturing his full body and two focused on his face) recorded his facial and body movements. Jeff White, ILM's visual effects supervisor, aimed for a more realistic depiction of the Hulk compared to the one seen in Ang Lee's 2003 film, stating, "We really wanted to utilize everything we've developed the last 10 years and make it a pretty spectacular Hulk. One of the great design decisions was to incorporate Mark Ruffalo into the look of him. So, much of Hulk is based on Ruffalo and his performance, not only in motion capture and on set, but down to his eyes, his teeth, and his tongue."

ILM digitally recreated the majority of the New York cityscape featured in the film, covering approximately ten city blocks by four city blocks. To accomplish this, ILM dispatched a team of four photographers for an eight-week shoot to capture images of the area. Tyson Bidner, the New York location manager for the film, played a crucial role in securing the rights to nearly every building's likeness needed by ILM. Initially, there were plans to include OsCorp Tower from The Amazing Spider-Man (2012) in the film, as Disney and Sony Pictures had agreed to it. However, this idea was abandoned because much of the skyline had already been finalized. Weta Digital assumed responsibility for animating Iron Man during the forest duel, taking over from ILM. Guy Williams, Weta's visual effects supervisor, explained, "We shared assets back and forth with ILM, but our pipelines are unique and it's hard for other assets to plug into it. But in this case, we got their models and we had to redo the texture spaces because the way we texture maps is different." Williams highlighted that the most challenging aspect was reproducing Iron Man's reflective metal surfaces.

Scanline VFX handled the reveal shots of the Helicarrier, from Black Widow and Captain America's arrival on the carrier deck to its lift-off. Evil Eye Pictures integrated digital backgrounds into greenscreen footage for scenes set inside the Helicarrier. Colin Strause from Hydraulx mentioned their contribution, stating, "We did the opening ten minutes of the movie, other than the opening set-up in space", covering Loki's arrival on Earth and his subsequent escape from the S.H.I.E.L.D. base. Luma Pictures focused on the Helicarrier's bridge shots and integrated the graphic monitor displays developed by Cantina Creative. Fuel VFX handled shots in and around Tony Stark's penthouse at Stark Tower. Digital Domain crafted the asteroid environment where Loki encounters The Other. Method Design, based in Los Angeles, was responsible for the film's closing credits. Steve Viola, creative director at Method Design, described it as "a two-minute, self-contained main on end sequence created entirely in CG". He explained that they designed, modeled, textured, and lit all environments and many foreground objects for each shot. Assets from Marvel were modified extensively to create a post-battle macro sequence. Method Design also crafted a custom typeface for the main title of The Avengers as well as 30 in-scene credits.

== Music ==
In November 2011, Marvel announced that Alan Silvestri, who scored Captain America: The First Avenger, would compose the score for The Avengers. Silvestri commented on the challenge of the project, stating, "I've worked on films where there have been a number of stars and certainly worked on films where there have been characters of equal weight in terms of their level of importance and profile in the film, but this one is somewhat extreme in that regard because each of these characters has their own world and it's a very different situation. It's very challenging to look for a way to give everyone the weight and consideration they need, but at the same time the film is really about the coming together of these characters, which implies that there is this entity called the Avengers which really has to be representative of all of them together." Silvestri collaborated with the London Symphony Orchestra at Abbey Road Studios in London, England to develop the score. Whedon praised Silvestri's approach, stating, "The score is very old-fashioned, which is why [Silvestri] was letter-perfect for this movie because he can give you the heightened emotion, the [Hans Zimmer] school of 'I'm just feeling a lot right now!' but he can also be extraordinarily cue and character specific, which I love."

In March 2012, the Indian rock band Agnee released a music video for their single "Hello Andheron", serving as the theme song for the Indian release of the film. Hollywood Records released the soundtrack concept album inspired by the film, titled Avengers Assemble, on May 1, 2012, coinciding with the release of the score.

== Marketing ==
=== Trailers ===
The film was promoted at the 2010 San Diego Comic-Con, featuring a teaser trailer narrated by Samuel L. Jackson followed by an introduction of the cast. In June 2011, Marvel Studios announced that it would not hold a panel at the 2011 San Diego Comic-Con, as studio executives felt unprepared to meet their own past achievements and fan expectations with filming still in production. Subsequently, in July 2011, a teaser trailer intended as the post-credits scene of Captain America: The First Avenger briefly leaked online. Entertainment Weekly speculated that it originated from a preview screening, describing the footage as "shaky, fuzzy, flickering, and obviously filmed on a cell phone".

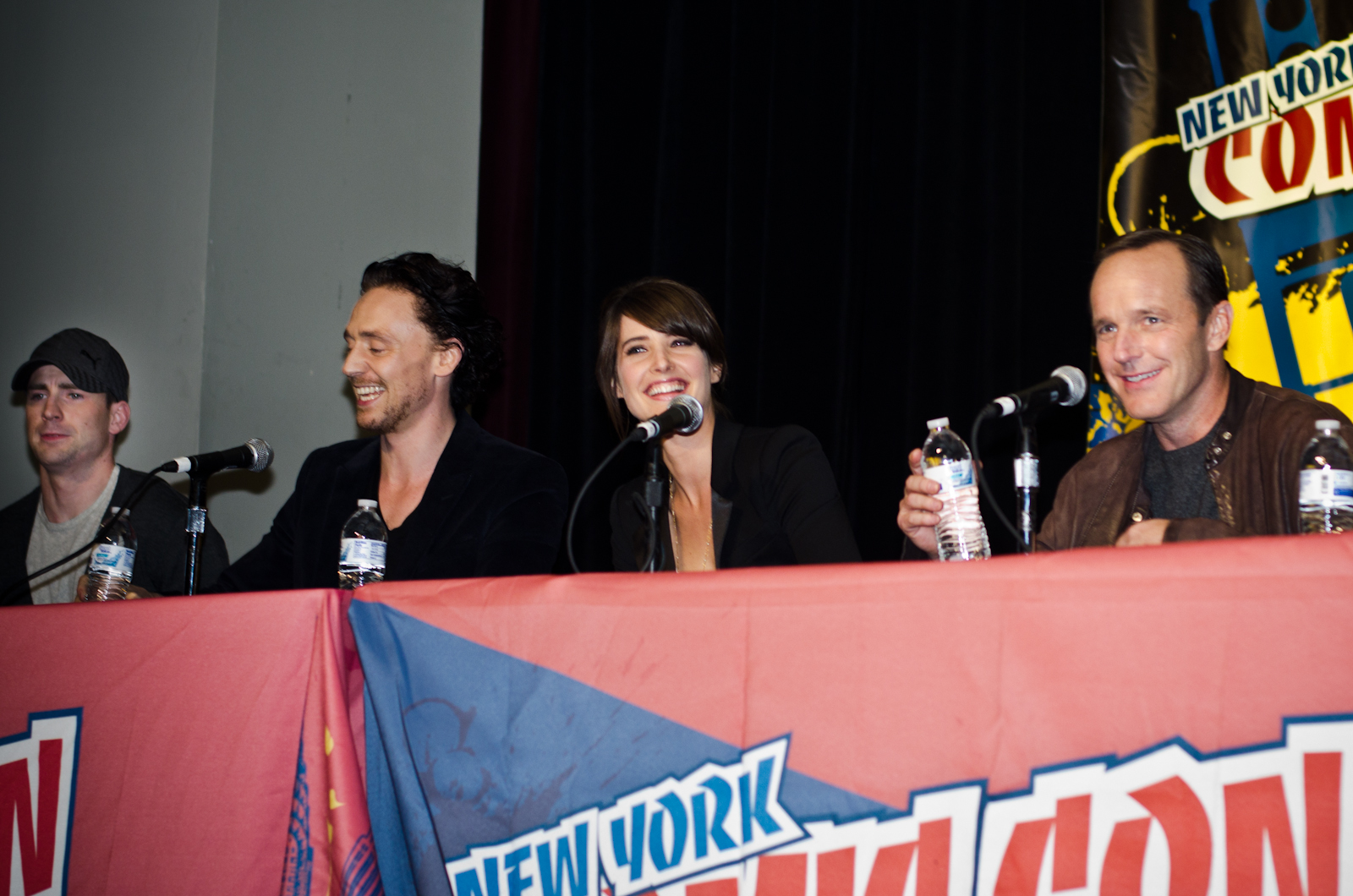
Chris Evans, Tom Hiddleston, Cobie Smulders, and Clark Gregg promoting the film at the 2011 New York Comic Con

In August 2011, Walt Disney Pictures, Pixar Animation Studios, and Marvel Studios presented a look at Walt Disney Studios' upcoming film slate, which included The Avengers, at the D23 Expo in Anaheim, California. The presentation featured footage from the film and appearances by the cast members. Later in August, Disney dismissed Marvel's executive vice president of worldwide marketing, vice president of worldwide marketing, and manager of worldwide marketing to bring their functions in-house.

In October 2011, Marvel Studios held a presentation at the New York Comic Con featuring new footage and a panel discussion including producer Kevin Feige and several cast members. The first full-length trailer was also released in October. Comic Book Resources noted, "The two-minute teaser handily establishes the movie's premise" and is "heavy on the assembling, but fans are also treated to plenty of action, as well glimpses [sic] of Iron Man's new armor and, best of all, the new take on the Incredible Hulk. Naturally, Robert Downey Jr.'s Tony Stark gets the best lines". However, The Hollywood Reporter called it, "Awesome. Or it would be if we hadn't seen all of this before and expected every single thing that we saw in the trailer". The trailer, which debuted exclusively on iTunes Movie Trailers, was downloaded over 10 million times in its first 24 hours, breaking the website's record for the most-viewed trailer. This record was surpassed by the trailer for The Dark Knight Rises (2012), which was downloaded more than 12.5 million times in its first 24 hours. A second full-length trailer was released on iTunes in February 2012, reaching a record 13.7 million downloads in 24 hours. The theatrical trailers of The Avengers appeared with many films, including Mission: Impossible – Ghost Protocol (2011), 21 Jump Street (2012), and The Hunger Games (2012).

In January 2012, Marvel Studios hosted a global Twitter chat. The 30-minute live tweeting event featured writer/director Joss Whedon and cast members Samuel L. Jackson, Tom Hiddleston, and Clark Gregg, along with a 10-second tease of the 30-second commercial that would air during Super Bowl XLVI in February. According to the Los Angeles Times, Disney paid an estimated $4 million for the 30-second spot. On May 1, 2012, executives from Marvel Studios, along with actors Tom Hiddleston and Clark Gregg, rang the opening bell of the New York Stock Exchange in honor of the film's theatrical release.

=== Tie-in comics ===
In December 2011, Marvel announced the release of an eight-issue comic-book prelude to the film, penned by Christopher Yost and Eric Pearson with art by Luke Ross and Daniel HDR, for release in March 2012. In February 2012, Marvel revealed plans for a second limited series comic book tie-in titled Black Widow Strikes, written by Fred Van Lente, who wrote Captain America: First Vengeance, the comic-book prequel to Captain America: The First Avenger. Set between Iron Man 2 and The Avengers, it follows Black Widow as she ties up loose ends from the former film. Additionally, the title Avengers Assemble debuted in March 2012, written by Brian Michael Bendis with art by Mark Bagley, featuring the same Avengers lineup as the film in a battle against a new incarnation of the supervillain team Zodiac.

=== Promotional partners ===
Paul Gitter, president of consumer products at Marvel Entertainment, noted that the anticipation leading up to the film bolstered retail partnerships: "Retailers have been less tolerant with [intellectual property] films, so we decided that if we started on this coordinated strategy several years ago, retailers would give us shelf space throughout the years and we would have a more sustainable position in the marketplace."

In September 2011, photos emerged online showing Robert Downey Jr. driving a new model Acura. An Acura spokesperson later confirmed the company's involvement with the film, stating, "As you may know, Acura has been in the Marvel Comics Universe films as the official car of their fictional law enforcement agency called S.H.I.E.L.D. That relationship continues for The Avengers. The open-top sports car that was photographed yesterday is a one-off, fictional car that was made just for the movie and will not be produced. That said, as you may also know, our CEO has said publicly that we are studying the development of a new sportscar, but we can't say any more about it at this time." In December 2011, Acura announced that a new NSX, styled along the lines of the concept built for The Avengers, would be unveiled at the 2012 North American International Auto Show. Additionally, a series of 10 S.H.I.E.L.D. SUVs, based on the Acura MDX with modifications by Cinema Vehicle Services, were also created for the film.

In February 2012, Marvel announced a partnership with fragrance company JADS to promote The Avengers with character-based fragrances. The announcement preceded the Toy Industry Association's annual February exhibition, where representatives showcased the products at a sampling booth. Other promotional partners included bracelet-maker Colantotte, Dr Pepper, Farmers Insurance, Harley-Davidson, Hershey, Land O'Frost lunchmeats, Oracle, Red Baron pizza, Symantec, Visa, and Wyndham Hotels & Resorts. Marvel and its parent company Disney secured an estimated $100 million in worldwide marketing support for the film. Notably absent from the promotional lineup were Baskin-Robbins, Burger King, and Dunkin' Donuts, which had partnered with Marvel in the past when their films were distributed by Paramount; Disney generally avoids promotions through fast food outlets.

=== Video game ===
A video game based on the film was initially planned for simultaneous release. It was intended to be a combination of a first-person shooter and a brawler for the Xbox 360, PlayStation 3, Wii U, and Microsoft Windows platforms, with THQ as the publisher. The console versions were to be developed by THQ Studio Australia, while Blue Tongue Entertainment was tasked with creating the PC version. However, after THQ shut down both studios, the game was ultimately canceled. Consequently, the intellectual property rights for an Avengers video game reverted to Marvel, which stated that it was exploring potential publishing and licensing opportunities. A mobile game published by Gameloft was released in May 2012.

In May 2012, a collaboration between Ubisoft and Marvel Entertainment was revealed, unveiling their joint project: a motion-controlled game titled Marvel Avengers: Battle for Earth designed for the Wii U and Xbox 360 Kinect. Inspired by the "Secret Invasion" storyline, the game showcases 20 different characters. Additionally, Marvel announced the development of a four-chapter mobile game titled Avengers Initiative, with each chapter dedicated to exploring the adventures of Hulk, Captain America, Thor, and Iron Man.

== Release ==
=== Theatrical ===
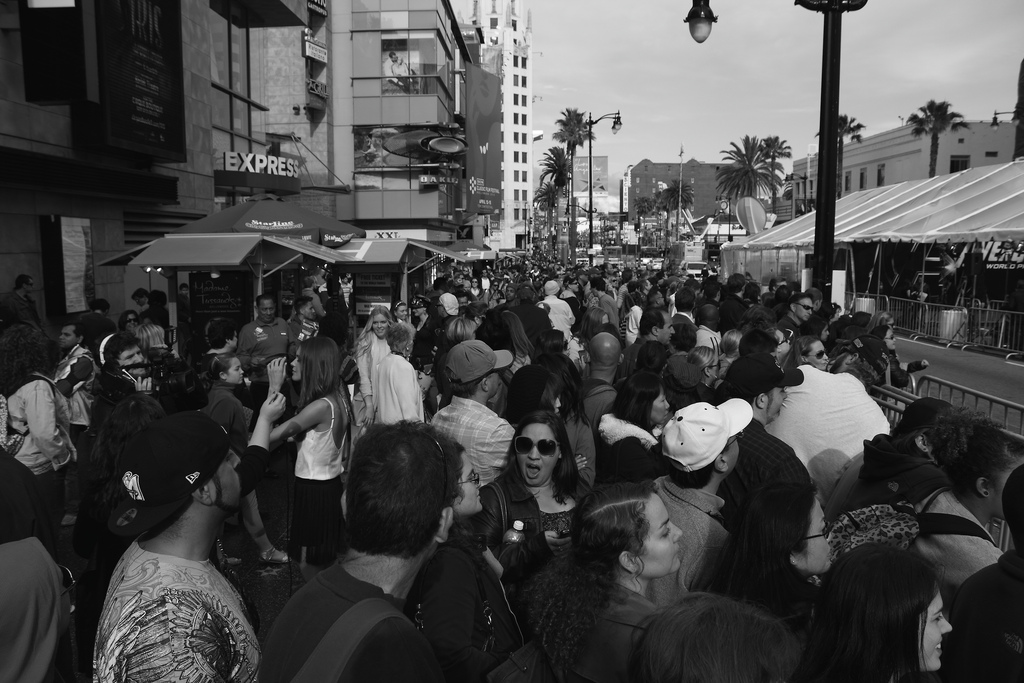
Fans gather outside Hollywood's El Capitan Theatre for the world premiere of the film.

In February 2012, Disney announced a title change for the film in the United Kingdom to avoid confusion with the British TV series of the same name and its 1998 film adaptation. This caused uncertainty over the film's actual title. Empire magazine reported that the film would be titled Marvel Avengers Assemble, while The Hollywood Reporter said that it would be called simply Avengers Assemble. Marvel's UK website referred to it as Marvel's Avengers Assemble, though David Cox of The Guardian, in arguing that it was one of the worst film titles ever, considered this a production notes error. The British Board of Film Classification and the Irish Film Classification Office listed it as Marvel Avengers Assemble. Frank Lovece in FilmFestivalTraveler.com noted the discrepancy, observing that the film is formally titled "Marvel's The Avengers" on screen, despite the absence of an apostrophe on posters. Feige explained the UK title's additional word, emphasizing the thorough decision-making process involved.

The film's world premiere took place on April 11, 2012, at Hollywood's El Capitan Theatre. It closed the 11th Annual Tribeca Film Festival with a screening on April 28. For the 2012 U.S. Labor Day weekend, the film received an expanded one-week theatrical push, increasing the number of theaters from 123 to 1,700. The Avengers was the last film released in Phase One of the MCU.

=== Home media ===
The film was released by Walt Disney Studios Home Entertainment on Blu-ray Disc, Blu-ray 3D, DVD, and digital download on September 25 in the United States and as early as August 29 in various international markets. Feige mentioned that the Blu-ray version features a new Marvel One-Shot titled Item 47 (2012), along with "a number of deleted scenes and a few storylines that fell by the wayside during the editing process". These include "a few more scenes with the S.H.I.E.L.D. agent Maria Hill, played by Cobie Smulders", and "some slightly different versions of Maria Hill and Nick Fury's interaction with the World Security Council".

The film was also collected in a 10-disc box set titled "Marvel Cinematic Universe: Phase One – Avengers Assembled", which includes all of the Phase One films in the Marvel Cinematic Universe. This box set was released on April 2, 2013. Walt Disney Studios Home Entertainment subsequently released the film on Ultra HD Blu-ray on August 14, 2018.

Some fans have criticized the UK DVD and Blu-ray release for omitting Joss Whedon's audio commentary and altering the scene involving Phil Coulson's death from the film's theatrical version. Disney's UK division stated that the "less graphic depiction of Agent Coulson's confrontation with Loki" occurred because "[e]ach country has its own compliance issues relative to depictions of violence. Unfortunately, another region's elements were inadvertently used to create the UK in-home release".

Upon its first week of release on home media in the U.S., the film topped the Nielsen VideoScan First Alert chart, which tracks overall disc sales, as well as the dedicated Blu-ray Disc sales chart. It garnered 72% of unit sales from Blu-ray, setting a record for a new release in which both the DVD and Blu-ray formats were released simultaneously.

In July 2024, a Lakota language dub of the film became available on Disney+. Downey, Evans, Hemsworth, Ruffalo, Johansson, and Renner reprised their roles to re-record their lines, with the project spear-headed by Ruffalo. Ruffalo had a previous relationship with the Lakota people and was looking to help further the Lakota's efforts to help revitalize their language.

== Reception ==
=== Box office ===
The Avengers grossed $623.4 million in the United States and Canada, and $895.5 million in other territories, for a worldwide total of $1.519 billion, making it the third-highest-grossing film of all time, the highest-grossing film of 2012, the highest-grossing comic book adaptation, the highest-grossing superhero film, and the highest-grossing film ever released by Walt Disney Studios, at the time of its release. The film's worldwide opening of $392.5 million ranked as the fourth-largest. The Avengers also became the fifth film distributed by Disney and the twelfth film overall to earn more than $1 billion. It reached this milestone in 19 days, matching the record previously set by Avatar (2009) and Harry Potter and the Deathly Hallows – Part 2 (2011). Its grosses exceeded its estimated $220 million production cost 12 days after its release. It was the first Marvel production to generate $1 billion in ticket sales.

==== United States and Canada ====
At the time of its release, the film became the third-highest-grossing film of all time, the highest-grossing film of 2012, the highest-grossing film distributed by Disney, the highest-grossing superhero film, and the highest-grossing film based on comics. It opened Friday, May 4, 2012, on around 11,800 screens across 4,349 theaters, earning $80.8 million, marking the second-biggest opening and second-biggest single-day gross. The film's Friday gross included an $18.7 million midnight run, a record for a superhero film Without midnight grosses, the film earned the largest opening-day gross ($62.1 million). It also set records for Saturday and Sunday grosses ($69.6 million and $57.1 million, respectively). In total, it earned $207,438,708 for its debut weekend, setting an opening-weekend record, including an IMAX opening-weekend record of $15.3 million and a record for opening-weekend grosses originating from 3D showings ($108 million). The opening-weekend audience was evenly split between those under and over the age of 25, with 60% male, 55% couples, 24% families, and 21% teenagers. Earning $103.1 million on its second weekend, the film set a record for the largest second-weekend gross. Other records set by the film include the biggest weekend per-theater average for a wide release ($47,698 per theater), the fastest film to reach $100 million and each additional $50 million through $550 million, and the largest cumulative gross through every day of release until, and including, its forty-third day (with the exception of its first day). It remained in first place at the box office for three consecutive weekends. The film set a record for the highest monthly share, with its $532.5 million total (through May 31, 2012) accounting for 52% of the total earnings at the box office during May.

===== Records =====
The film set the following records upon its theatrical release.

Record title	Record detail	Reference
Opening weekend for any film	$207,438,708	
Opening week for any film	$270,019,373	
Opening weekend, adjusted for ticket pricing	$207.4 million	
Theater average – wide release	$47,698	
3D gross during opening weekend	$108 million	
IMAX gross during opening weekend	$15.3 million	
Second weekend for any film	$103,052,274	
Monthly share of domestic earnings	May 2012, 52%	
Highest cumulative gross	2 – 43 days	
Days to reach $100^{*}, $150 million	2 days^{*}	
Days to reach $200, $250, $300, $350, $400, $450 million	3, 6, 9, 10, 14, 17 days respectively	
Days to reach $500, $550 million	23, 31 days	
May opening	$207,438,708	
Opening weekend for a superhero film	$207,438,708	
Highest-grossing superhero film	$623,357,910	

^{*} By the end of its second day, the film's gross exceeded that of all eight films that had reached $100 million after two days.

==== Other territories ====
The film became the third-highest-grossing film of all time, the highest-grossing Disney-distributed film, the highest-grossing film of 2012, and the highest-grossing superhero film. It opened on Wednesday, April 25, 2012, in 10 countries, earning $17.1 million. It expanded to 29 more countries on April 26 and 27, grossing $73.1 million in three days. By Sunday, April 29, it had amassed an opening-weekend total of $185.1 million from 39 countries. It maintained its first-place position at the box office for four consecutive weekends. The film set opening-day records in New Zealand, Malaysia, and Iceland, as well as single-day records in the Philippines. It also achieved both single- and opening-day records in Singapore and Thailand. Additionally, it earned the second-highest-grossing opening day in Australia ($6.2 million), Mexico, the Philippines, and Vietnam. Furthermore, it established opening-weekend records in numerous territories, including Mexico, Brazil, Ecuador, Bolivia, Taiwan, the Philippines, Hong Kong, the United Arab Emirates, Argentina, Peru, and Central America. It also secured the second-largest five-day opening in Australia ($20.2 million).

In the United Kingdom, the film earned £2.5 million ($4.1 million) on its opening day and £15.8 million ($25.7 million) over the weekend, setting a new opening-weekend record for a superhero film. It emerged as the market's highest-grossing superhero film. In Latin America, it set records as the highest-grossing film ($207 million) and the first film to surpass $200 million. It also claimed the top spot as the highest-grossing film in the Philippines, Singapore, and Indonesia. As of February 2021, the film's leading international markets were China ($83 million), United Kingdom ($80.5 million), Brazil ($63.9 million), Mexico ($61.7 million), and Australia ($54.5 million).

=== Critical response ===
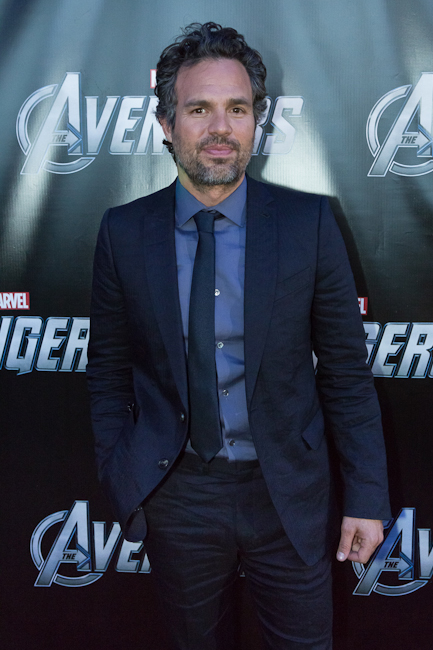
Mark Ruffalo at the film's Toronto premiere. His performance garnered critical acclaim.

The review aggregator Rotten Tomatoes reported an approval rating of 91%, with an average score of 8.1/10, based on 363 reviews. The website's critical consensus reads, "Thanks to a script that emphasizes its heroes' humanity and a wealth of superpowered set pieces, The Avengers lives up to its hype and raises the bar for Marvel at the movies." Metacritic, which uses a weighted average, assigned the film a score of 69 out of 100 based on 43 reviews, indicating "generally favorable" reviews. Audiences polled by CinemaScore gave the film a rare "A+" grade on an "A+ to F" scale.

Todd McCarthy of The Hollywood Reporter gave a positive review of the film, remarking, "It's clamorous, the save-the-world story is one everyone's seen time and again, and the characters have been around for more than half a century in 500 comic book issues. But Whedon and his cohorts have managed to stir all the personalities and ingredients together so that the resulting dish, however familiar, is irresistibly tasty again." To Rolling Stone journalist Peter Travers, the film epitomized an exceptional blockbuster. "It's also the blockbuster," Travers said, "I saw in my head when I imagined a movie that brought together the idols of the Marvel world in one shiny, stupendously exciting package. It's Transformers with a brain, a heart and a working sense of humor." Justin Chang of Variety wrote, "Like a superior, state-of-the-art model built from reconstituted parts, Joss Whedon's buoyant, witty, and robustly entertaining superhero smash-up is escapism of a sophisticated order, boasting a tonal assurance and rich reserves of humor that offset the potentially lumbering and unavoidably formulaic aspects of this 143-minute team-origin story." Kenneth Turan of the Los Angeles Times complimented the film's frenetic pace, while Roger Ebert of the Chicago Sun-Times commented that it "provides its fans with exactly what they desire. Whether it is exactly what they deserve is arguable". Conversely, A. O. Scott of The New York Times believed that "while The Avengers is hardly worth raging about, its failures are significant and dispiriting. The light, amusing bits cannot overcome the grinding, hectic emptiness, the bloated cynicism that is less a shortcoming of this particular film than a feature of the genre."

The performances of several cast members were a frequent topic in the critiques. In particular, Mark Ruffalo's portrayal of Dr. Bruce Banner/the Hulk was well received by commentators. Joe Neumaier opined that his performance was superior to the rest of the cast; stating, "Ruffalo is the revelation, turning Banner into a wry reservoir of calm ready to become a volcano." Similarly, The New Yorker's Anthony Lane proclaimed Ruffalo's acting to be one of the film's highlights—alongside Downey. The Village Voice's Karina Longworth concluded: "Ruffalo successfully refreshes the Hulk myth, playing Banner as an adorably bashful nerd-genius who, in contrast to the preening hunks on the team, knows better than to draw attention to himself." Travers asserted that the actor resonated a "scruffy warmth and humor" vibe, while Turan felt that he surpassed predecessors Edward Norton and Eric Bana in playing the character. Owen Gleiberman of Entertainment Weekly wrote that "the smartest thing the filmmakers did was to get Mark Ruffalo to play Bruce Banner as a man so sensitive that he's at war, every moment, with himself. (The film finally solves the Hulk problem: He's a lot more fun in small doses.)"

Referring to Downey, Joe Morgenstein of The Wall Street Journal—despite complimenting Downey's performance—favored his work in Iron Man over his acting in The Avengers: "His Iron Man is certainly a team player, but Mr. Downey comes to the party with two insuperable superpowers: a character of established sophistication—the industrialist/inventor Tony Stark, a sharp-tongued man of the world—and his own quicksilver presence that finds its finest expression in self-irony." Neumaier praised Evans, stating that he accurately conveyed his character's internal conflicts.

Commentators appreciated the character development and dialogue. Associated Press reviewer Christy Lemire wrote that the script "sparkles as brightly as the special effects; these people may be wearing ridiculous costumes but they're well fleshed-out underneath." Scott suggested that certain parts of the film exuded a charm reminiscent of the western film Rio Bravo (1959). Longworth felt that while Whedon's script delved into the backstory of the characters, the film did not explore it "in a substantive way".

=== Accolades ===
At the 85th Academy Awards, The Avengers received a nomination for Best Visual Effects. The film's other nominations include two Annie Awards (winning one), a British Academy Film Award, and three Critics' Choice Movie Awards. In 2017, it was featured as one of the 100 greatest films of all time in Empire magazine's poll of The 100 Greatest Movies.

== Sequels ==
Avengers: Age of Ultron was written and directed by Whedon, and released on May 1, 2015. The film features much of the original cast, alongside new additions including Elizabeth Olsen as Scarlet Witch, Aaron Taylor-Johnson as Quicksilver, Paul Bettany as Vision, and James Spader as Ultron. Avengers: Infinity War and Avengers: Endgame were directed by Anthony and Joe Russo, with a script by Christopher Markus and Stephen McFeely. Infinity War was released on April 27, 2018, followed by Endgame on April 26, 2019. The ensemble cast for both films includes returning actors from previous MCU entries, as well as new characters from other films in the franchise.

== See also ==
- "What If... the World Lost Its Mightiest Heroes?", an episode of the MCU television series What If...? that reimagines some events of this film
