= Plum Brook Reactor =

Coordinates: 41.38585°N 82.68293°W

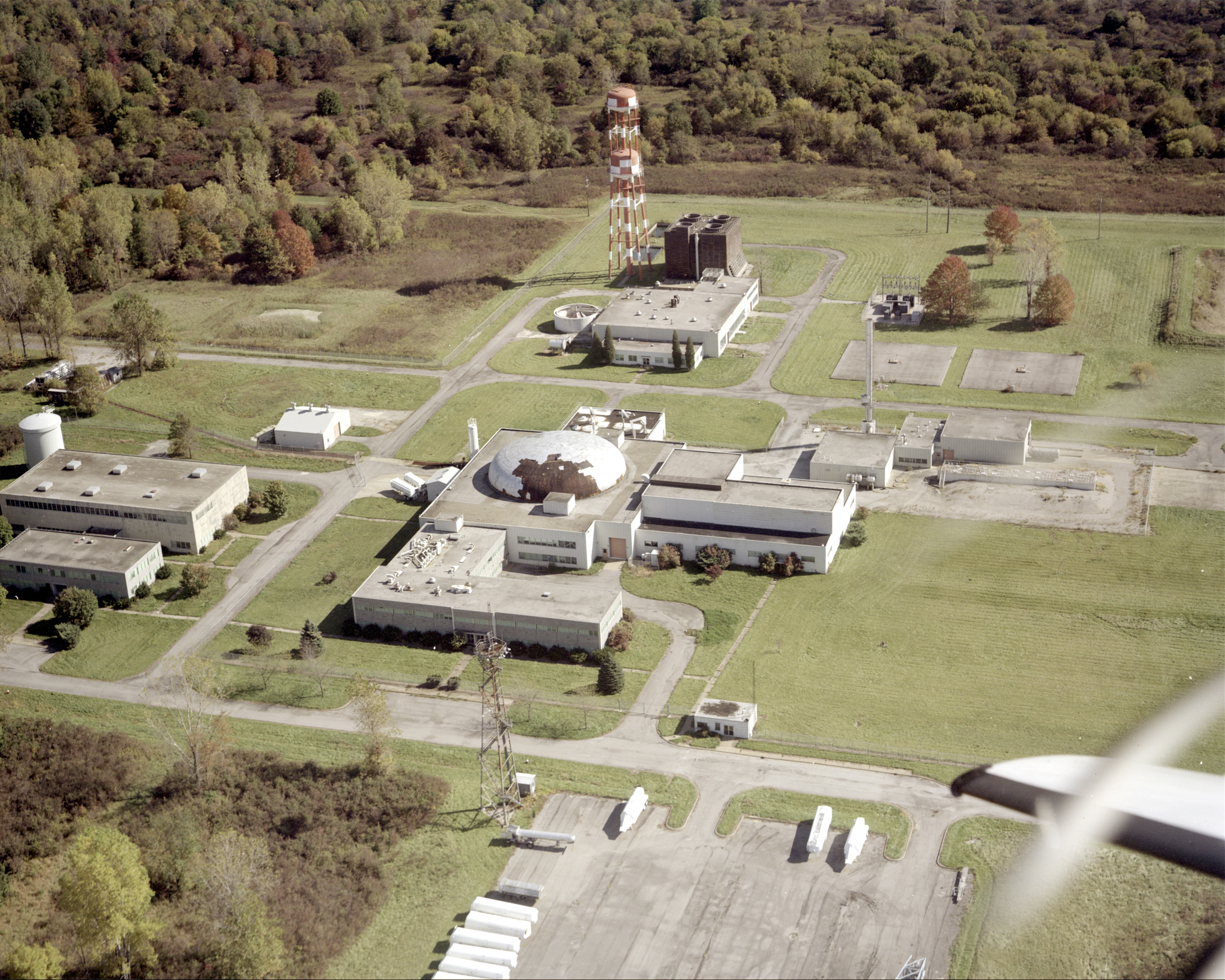
The reactor facility in 1981

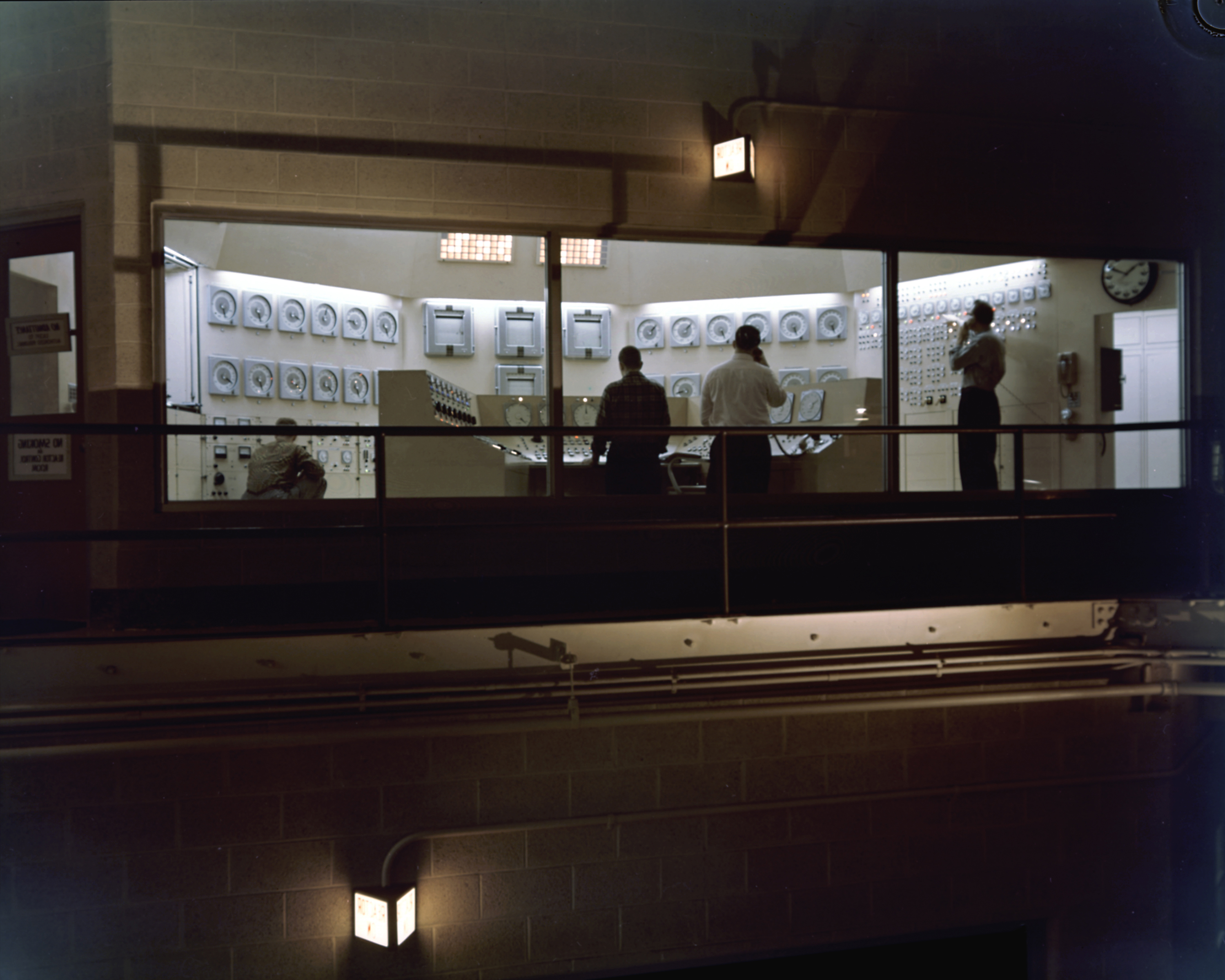
The control room in 1961

The Plum Brook Reactor was a NASA 60 megawatt water-cooled and moderated research nuclear reactor, located in Sandusky, Ohio, 50 mi west of the NASA Glenn Research Center (at that time the NASA Lewis Research Center) in Cleveland, of which it was organizationally a part.

The reactor was originally planned for the NACA nuclear airplane project. After that was cancelled in 1961, it became the primary NASA facility for space-related nuclear energy research and development. Experimental efforts included scientific and technical investigations of nuclear energy for spaceflight propulsion, nuclear power systems, and radiation exposure. The station included several large test facilities besides the reactor, including liquid hydrogen facilities for development and testing of the Centaur upper stage. The reactor first went critical on 14 June 1961, and was finally shut down on 5 January 1973.

The facility's decommissioning began in 1998, and the last of its structures was demolished in May 2012. The entire process ultimately cost $253 million, significantly more than the inflation-adjusted cost of constructing the facility.
