= Ramon Lugo III =

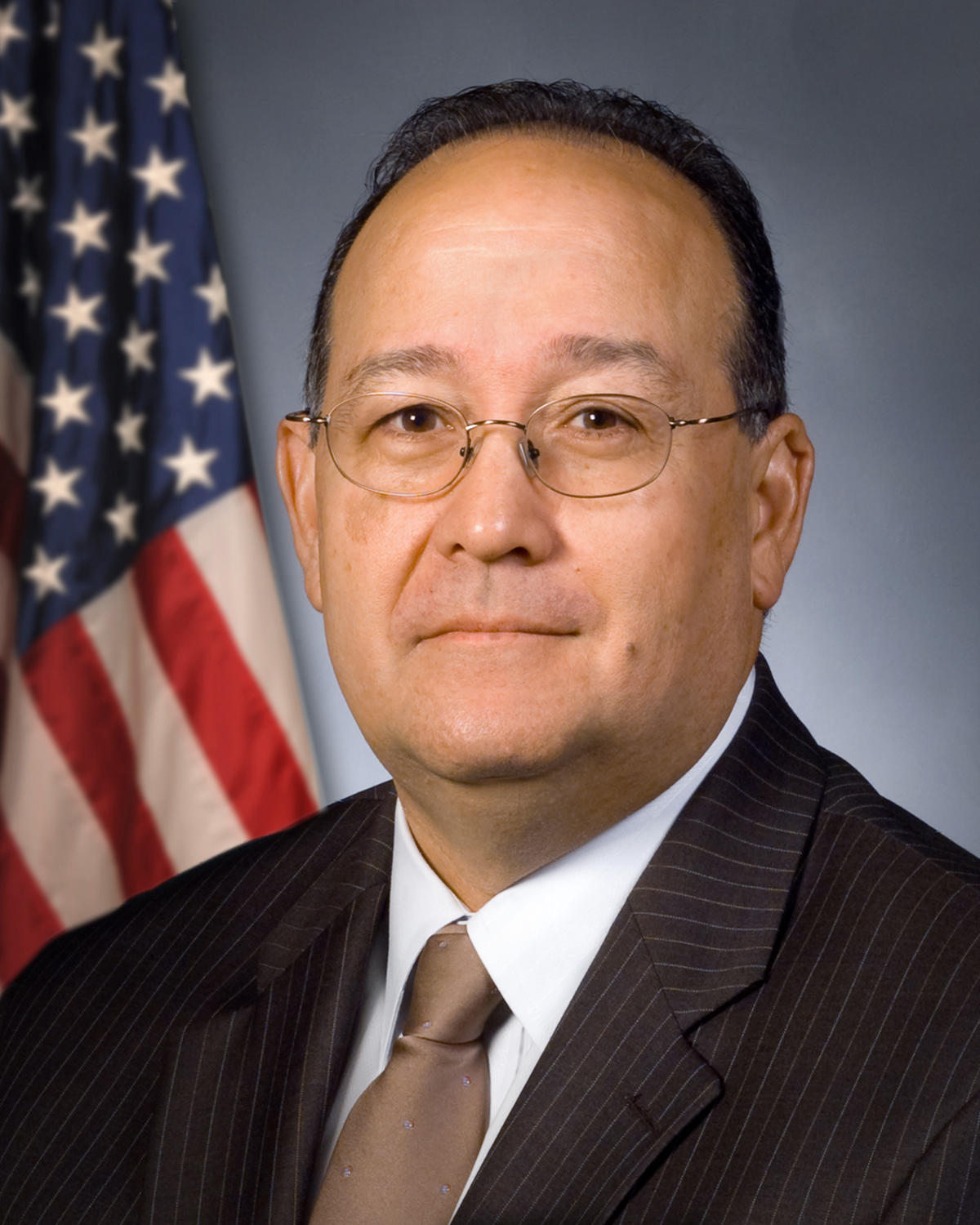

Director of the Glenn Research Center
- In office April 2010 – January 2013
- President: Barack Obama

Personal details
- Born: USA
- Education: University of Central Florida (BSE); Florida Institute of Technology (MEM); Harvard University (PMD)
- Profession: Engineer, Administrator

Ramon "Ray" Lugo III is an American aerospace engineer who served as the director of NASA's Glenn Research Center. He currently serves as the director of the Florida Space Institute at the University of Central Florida. He previously served as Glenn's deputy director from 2007 to 2010.

== Career ==
Lugo received his bachelor's degree in engineering from the University of Central Florida in 1979, and his master's degree in engineering management from the Florida Institute of Technology in 1982. He began his career with NASA while still a student at UCF in 1975. During his career he served as the executive director of the Cape Canaveral Spaceport Management Office, director and deputy director of the Expandable Launch Vehicle Services Program, manager of the Facilities and Support Equipment Division in the Space Station Program Office, and as chief of the Joint Performance Management Office.

In April 2010, he was named the director of the Glenn Research Center in Cleveland, Ohio. Prior to being selected as the director, he previously served as the facility's deputy director since 2007.
