= The Silent Generation (album) =

Studio album by The Dimes
- Released: December 11, 2007
- Genres: Folk/Pop; Alternative Rock; Indie Rock; Indie Pop; Folk Rock; Art Rock; Baroque Pop; Pop/Rock
- Length: 37:35
- Label: Timber Carnival Records

The Dimes chronology
The Long Arm Came Down (EP) (2007)	The Silent Generation (2007)	New England (EP) (2008)

Professional ratings
Review scores
Source	Rating
Allmusic	3.5/5 stars

The Silent Generation is the debut album by The Dimes, released on December 11, 2007, via the label Timber Carnival Records.

== Track listing ==
1. "Jersey Kid" - 1:58
2. "Paul Kern Can't Sleep" - 3:15
3. "New York 1930" - 2:03
4. "Catch Me Jumping" - 3:06
5. "Battle of San Jacinto" - 4:15
6. "Chicago 1929" - 1:33
7. "Letters in the Sea" - 3:26
8. "Stacked Brown Boxes" - 3:21
9. "This Time" - 3:36
10. "Salt and Foam" - 3:11
11. "Emmy Divine" - 2:24
12. "Up for Air" - 3:25
13. "The Silent Generation" - 2:02
