= Creekside Mushrooms =

Fungi farm in Pennsylvania

- Type: Mushroom farm
- Industry: Fungiculture
- Headquarters: 1 Moonlight Drive, Worthington, Pennsylvania, United States
- Key people: Dan Lucovich (president)
- Products: Moonlight brand white button mushrooms

Creekside Mushrooms is a mushroom farm located on Moonlight Drive in Worthington, Pennsylvania, United States.

== Description ==
Creekside Mushrooms consists of 150 miles of "maze-like" tunnels 300 feet underground located in a former limestone mine and is the largest mushroom production facility in the world.

== Filming location ==
A chase sequence in the 2012 superhero film The Avengers was shot at the facility.
