= Dime Savings Bank =

Dime Savings Bank may refer to:

- Dime Savings Bank of Williamsburgh, Brooklyn
- Dime Savings Bank of New York, originally Dime Savings Bank of Brooklyn
- Dime Savings Bank of Detroit, Michigan
- Dime Savings Bank of Toledo, Ohio
