= NASA Environmental Management System =

NASA-developed environmental information management software

The Environmental Management System (EMS) of NASA was developed under the standards of the ISO 14001. In creating the EMS it was necessary to provide maximum flexibility to each centers of NASA while living up to the standards of the ISO 14001, along with the "Executive Order 13148". The system was designed to benefit by "increased involvement of management and shop level personnel; reduced mission delays; improved procedures; reduction in single point failures; identification of pollution prevention opportunities; improved compliance; and better relationships with regulators and the public".

== History ==
The EMS was tested at the Glenn Research Center in Cleveland, Ohio, Johnson Space Center in Houston, Texas, and Stennis Space Center in Bay St. Louis, Mississippi. The test study was carried out to evaluate the challenges of the system, including costs, resource requirements, and benefits.

NASA's EMS development team has received the Circle Award from the White House for "creating an agency wide environmental management system".

== Current role ==
EMS is part of NASA's overall management system that integrates environmental concerns and issues into operational processes. The EMS offers a systematic approach to evaluating and managing all potential environmental ramifications of NASA operations and assists in prioritizing issues and monitoring performance improvements. NASA's EMS model consists of a continual cycle of environmental policy, planning, implementation, checking and corrective actions, and management review. Following this model provides an efficient way of doing business. The EMS allows the prediction of potential environmental problems early in the planning process, provides for the design of activities to minimize or avoid these problems, and allows for a continuous check or audit of environmental performance, making improvements where appropriate.
