= Detroit Institute of Music Education =

College

Coordinates: 42°20′00.7″N 83°02′59.7″W

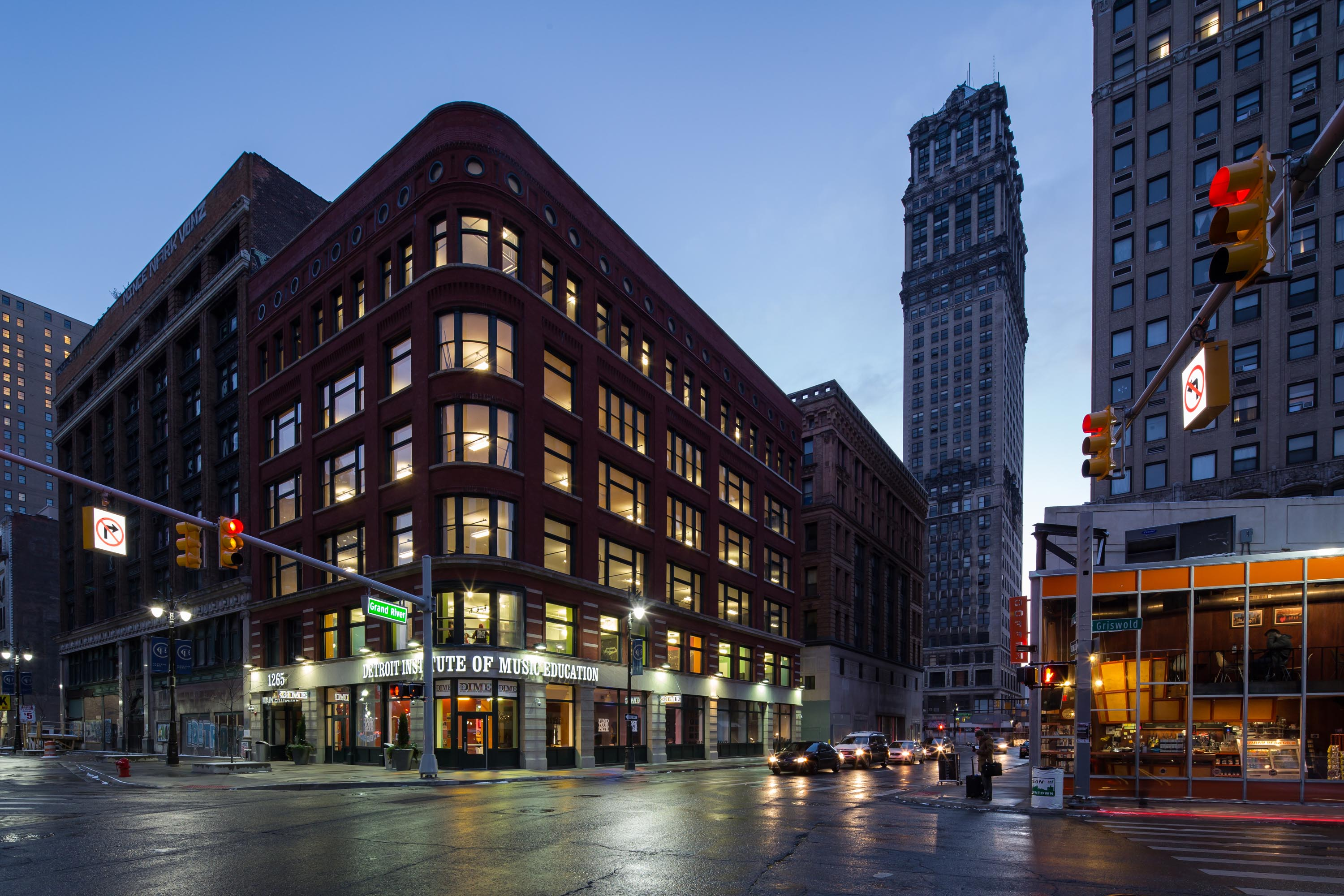
View of DIME DETROIT

DIME DETROIT (Detroit Institute of Music Education) is a for-profit college based in Detroit, Michigan.

== History ==
DIME Detroit opened in fall 2014 with an initial tuition of $39,000 for its three-year BA program. The school originally partnered with Falmouth University to validate its degrees.

In March 2016, DIME partnered with Metropolitan State University to make students eligible for federal aid. DIME opened a second campus,DIME Denver, in the Santa Fe Arts District. This partnership ended in March 2020.

In 2020, DIME reopened with a new partnership with Oakland University. DIME was founded by Kevin Nixon and Sarah Clayman. The Beringea Group invested 3 million dollars in DIME to help it open. Prior to founding DIME, Nixon and Clayman founded and managed the for-profit Brighton Institute of Modern Music.
