= The Dimes =

- Origin: Portland, Oregon, U.S.
- Genres: Folk/Pop; Alternative Rock; Indie Rock; Indie Pop; Folk Rock; Art Rock; Baroque Pop; Pop/Rock
- Website: www.thedimes.com

The Dimes are an American folk-pop band from Portland, Oregon. While The Dimes have released four EPs under their own self-titled label, The Dimes, their album, The Silent Generation, recorded under the label Pet Marmoset, is considered their debut album. The songs on The Silent Generation were largely based on stories which singer–songwriter Johnny Clay read in Depression-era newspapers, and which guitarist Pierre Kaiser found under the floorboards of his 1908 Portland home. The album was released in December 2007 to positive critical reviews. Their song "Jersey Kid" was featured on NPR Music's Second Stage.

The Dimes released their follow-up album, The King Can Drink the Harbour Dry, on December 1, 2009. The album is based on the stories, people and history of Boston, Massachusetts. The band released a short EP, New England, in early 2009 which featured some of the songs slated to appear on The King Can Drink the Harbour Dry.

In mid-2010, The Dimes released an EP, William Dawes and other Forgotten Gems, of B-sides from the King record sessions, which featured some older songs that had long been part of their live show.

In recent years, The Dimes have become more of a solo recording project for Clay. The Dimes' 2014 single, "Love and Oceans" received numerous television and film placements, several prominent national and global advertisement campaigns, and was featured in the 2015 feature film trailer for Man Up, featuring Simon Pegg.

A constant collaborator, Clay is involved in several different co-writing and recording projects, and is half of the folk pop duo, Trimountaine, with singer/songwriter Kelly Anne Masigat. After releasing their self titled debut EP, the duo had some global exposure with "Keep Coming Back" — written, arranged and recorded for Coca-Cola's "Share a Coke" campaign.

The Dimes are the second band of the same name to form in Portland, Oregon, preceding the band composed of Meredith Butner, Steve Gevurtz, Katie Greenhoot, and Liza Stillhard. The Dimes released their self-titled album in 2001 and they also appear on the CD companion to the book, DIY in PDX, as well as a four-song album released in 2002 entitled, Will I?, Won't I?, Do I?, Don't I?.

== Band members ==
- Johnny Clay – Vocals, acoustic guitars, mandolin, Rhodes
- Pierre Kaiser – Electric guitar, tornado noises
- Kelly Masigat – Vocals, guitars, mandolin
- Anthony Powell – Guitars, Percussion
- Tucker Jackson – Pedal Steel Guitar
- Ryan Johnston – Bass guitar
- Jake Rahner – Drums

== Previous or occasional members ==
- Rian Lewis – Bass guitar
- Matt Farina – Drums
- Ehren Ebbage – Lap steel, acoustic guitar, and vocals.
- Mattie Kaiser – Viola
- Skip VonKuske – Cello
- Shawn Tuthill – Vocals, keyboards, percussion, and trumpet

== Discography ==
=== Albums ===
- The Silent Generation LP – 2007 (Pet Marmoset)
- The King Can Drink the Harbour Dry LP – 2009 (Timber Carnival Records)

=== EPs ===
- The Dimes EP – 2003 (The Dimes)
- Atlanta EP – 2005 (The Dimes)
- The Long Arm Came Down EP – 2007 (The Dimes)
- New England EP – 2008 (Pet Marmoset)
- William Dawes and Other Forgotten Gems EP – 2010 (Timber Carnival)
- Broadcast EP – 2013
