= DIME Denver =

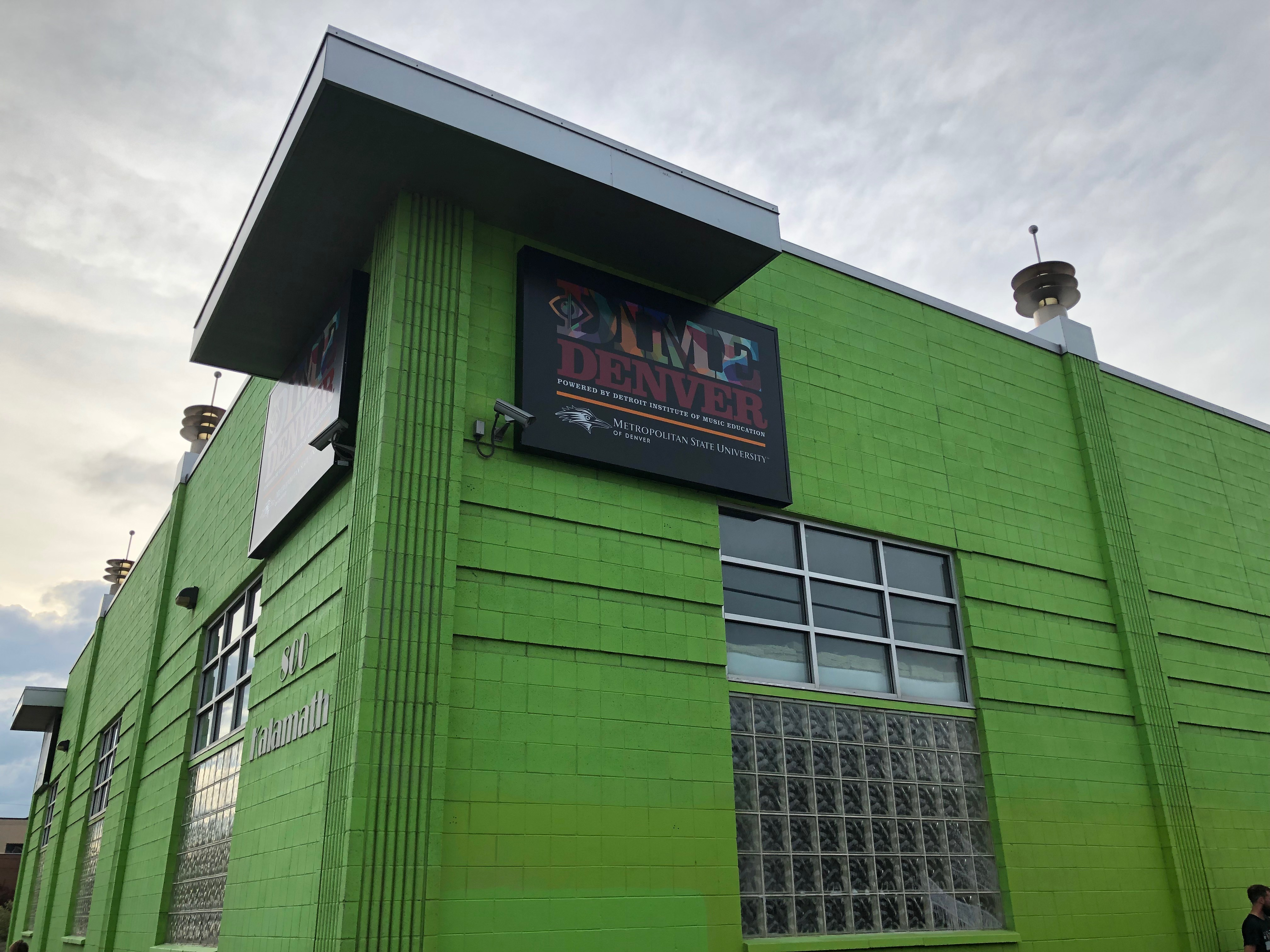
- DIME Denver
- Type: Private for-profit
- Active: 2017–2020
- Affiliation: Detroit Institute of Music Education
- Academic affiliation: Metropolitan State University of Denver (2016–2020)
- Location: Denver, USA; 39.729252°N 104.999580°W
- Website: dime-denver.com

DIME Denver was a for-profit college located in Denver, Colorado. It was a branch of the Detroit Institute of Music Education (DIME). The college offered certificate and bachelor's degree programs. In March 2016, DIME announced a partnership with Metropolitan State University of Denver after previously partnering with Falmouth University for accreditation. The financial agreement between DIME and Metropolitan State University was never publicly disclosed. The partnership with Metropolitan State University allowed DIME students to receive BA degrees through Metropolitan State University while paying the higher DIME tuition. DIME students paid significantly higher tuition than the regular Metropolitan State University rate. The cost of attendance to attend DIME Denver was $15,356 for the 2019–20 academic year.

DIME Denver was announced in November 2016 in a pop-up location in the basement of the Tivoli Student Union on the Auraria Campus. Students began attending DIME Denver in Fall, 2017. Enrollment numbers never reached expectations which led to financial problems for DIME and MSU Denver. In June 2020, Larry Sampler, MSU's chief operating officer, stated that "per an independent marketing study done in 2019, the financial prospects for the partnership going forward were impossibly dire. As of 2019, enrollment at both DIME locations produced only 168 students in 2019, fewer than half the 349 students required for the partnership to break even. Consolidated financial data for both DIME locations showed that in June of 2019 total tuition received was under $2M, while expenses were almost $4M. And, per projections agreed by both MSU Denver and DIME, these numbers were not expected to improve significantly in the coming years." On March 16, 2020, MSU notified DIME and the DIME students that they were ending the partnership between the two colleges. On June 3, 2020, the founders of DIME Denver announced that the college would permanently close immediately.

The DIME founders claim that MSU Denver “voluntarily breached” their agreement by refusing to adhere to the 360-day notice period of termination. In a statement they stated, “On March 16th 2020, as the COVID 19 lockdown began, and without prior notice to DIME Directors or senior management, Metropolitan State University of Denver unilaterally announced by email to all DIME students and faculty that they were ending the MSU Denver at DIME partnership agreement. Consequently, DIME has been forced to close DIME Denver."
