= Dime Tabernacle =

Church in Michigan, United States

Coordinates: 42°19′29.4″N 85°11′26.5″W

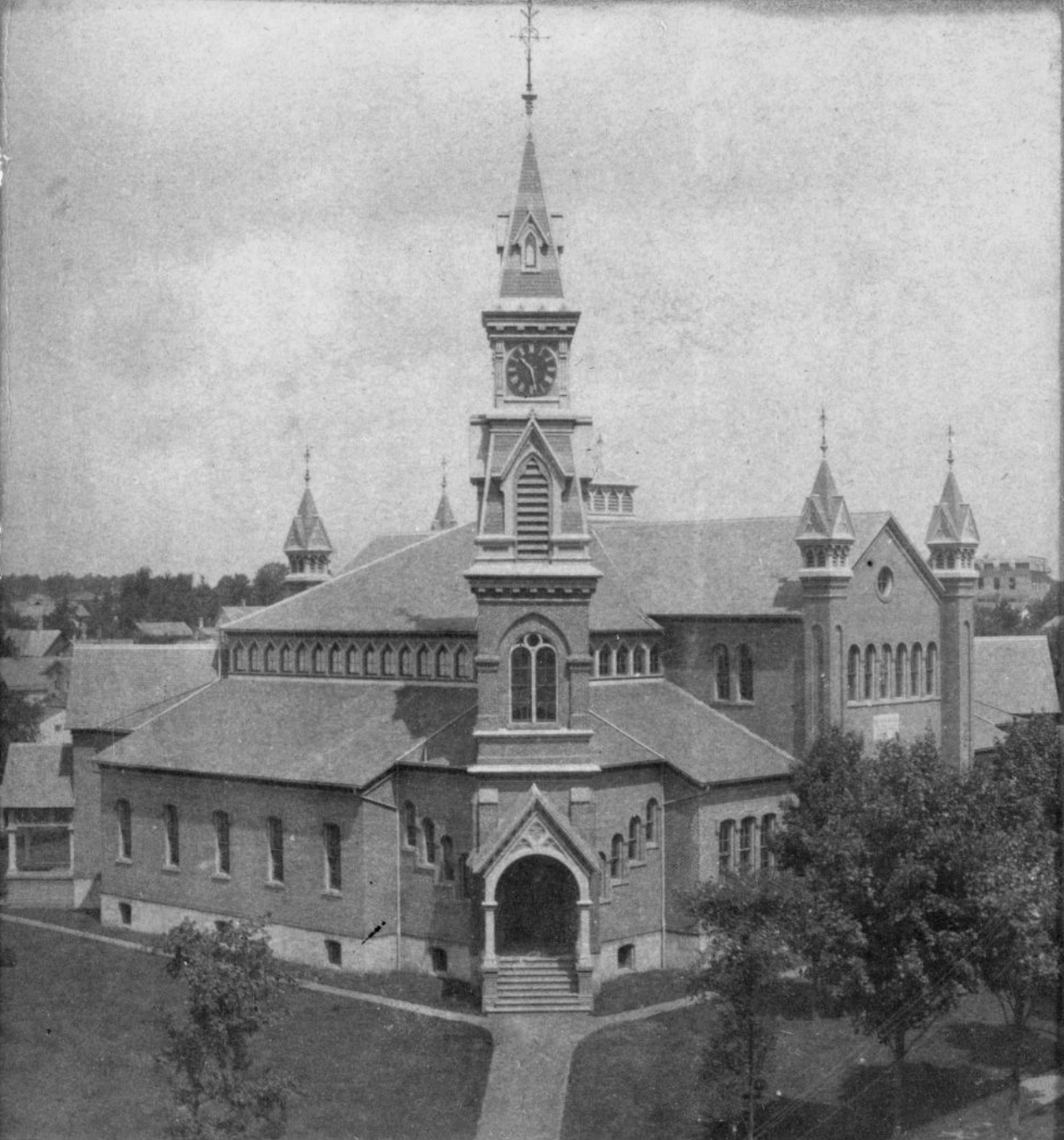
Stereocard showing the Seventh-day Adventist Dime Tabernacle before January 1922.

The Dime Tabernacle was the fourth Seventh-day Adventist church to be built in Battle Creek, Michigan.

It was dedicated on April 20, 1879, and could accommodate 4000 worshipers as Battle Creek had become the center of the Seventh Day Adventist leadership, and the work of the church after it formed. The unusual name comes from the way money was raised to build the church. James White suggested that all members donate a dime per month for one year to pay for the building.

Several General Conference Sessions were conducted there, including the 1901 session during which the current organizational structure of the church was established. The funerals of both James and Ellen G. White were conducted there.

The Dime Tabernacle was located on the corner of West Main (now West Michigan Avenue) and North Washington Street, facing McCamly Park.

The building was destroyed by fire on January 3, 1922.
