= Woodrow Whitlow Jr. =

NASA scientist

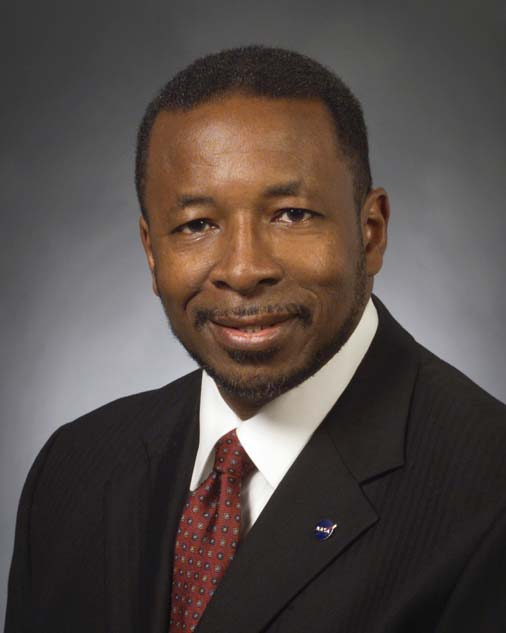
Woodrow Whitlow Jr.

Dr. Woodrow Whitlow Jr. is an American space scientist, currently the associate administrator for Mission Support at NASA. He was appointed to this position by NASA administrator Charles Bolden on February 3, 2010. Prior to this, he was director of the NASA Glenn Research Center in Cleveland Ohio.

Whitlow earned Bachelor of Science (1974), Master of Science (1975), and Doctor of Philosophy (1979) degrees in Aeronautics and Astronautics from the Massachusetts Institute of Technology, and began his professional career in 1979 as a research scientist at the NASA Langley Research Center in Hampton, Virginia, before moving to positions at NASA Lewis Research Center and NASA Kennedy Space Center, where he was deputy director before returning to NASA Glenn to serve as director.

The American Institute of Aeronautics and Astronautics named him an associate fellow in 1993 and a fellow in 2010.

He has also been awarded U.S. Black Engineer of the Year in Government, the NASA Exceptional Service Medal, NASA Equal Opportunity Honor Medal, the (British) Institution of Mechanical Engineers' William Sweet Smith Prize and the Presidential Rank Award of Meritorious Executive.
