= Dropping in a Microgravity Environment =

Contest held by NASA's Glenn Research Center

Dropping in a Microgravity Environment (DIME) is an annual contest held by NASA's Glenn Research Center. Teams of high school students, with one "faculty adviser", from anywhere in the United States or its territories can enter. The teams prepare and submit proposals for research to be performed; four teams are selected to travel to the Glenn Research Center and perform their experiments at the Zero Gravity Research Facility, in the "drop tower", a deep shaft that can be completely depressurized and thus simulate microgravity when an object is in free fall in it. A further four teams' experiments are selected and conducted by the Center staff. The teams are responsible for writing their proposals, assembly of the necessary equipment if their experiments are chosen to be performed, testing of the setups at their respective homes, and preparation and submission of reports to NASA about their results.

== History ==
The DIME competition was first held in 2001 with two winning teams selected, both from Ohio. The contests continued, with an increasing number and diversity of winning teams, through 2006. In 2007, the contests were suspended because of a decrease in emphasis on microgravity research in the budget, not enough money was available to continue it. They were resumed in 2009 with the selection of 11 winners (3 Tier III winners were chosen). A program for grade 6-9 students called WING was also announced in 2009. The number of winning teams was set at 8 in 2010, but due to budget cuts it was reduced to 4 in 2011, eliminating Tier II. The future of the program is unclear.

== Guidelines ==
In order to be selected, there must be a clear research question and a clear hypothesis that is related to the question. The hypothesis must be testable in 2.2 seconds, and gravity must be the experimental variable of the experiment. The utility of the proposed experiment in space exploration is an important criterion. The experimental apparatus may not be larger than a cube with sides of 12 in (300 mm). For safety reasons, the following are not allowed:

- Pressures more than 2 atm
- Radioactive materials
- Hazardous chemicals
- Biological samples (with the exception of common household materials) or living organisms

All electrical circuits must have circuit diagrams and be approved by Glenn staff. Wires must meet national standards.
