= Dime Community Bank =

American FDIC Bank

Coordinates: 40.695126°N 73.991060°W

Dime Commercial Bancshares
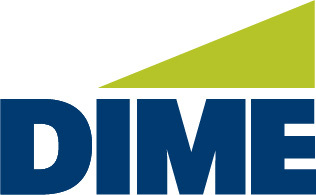

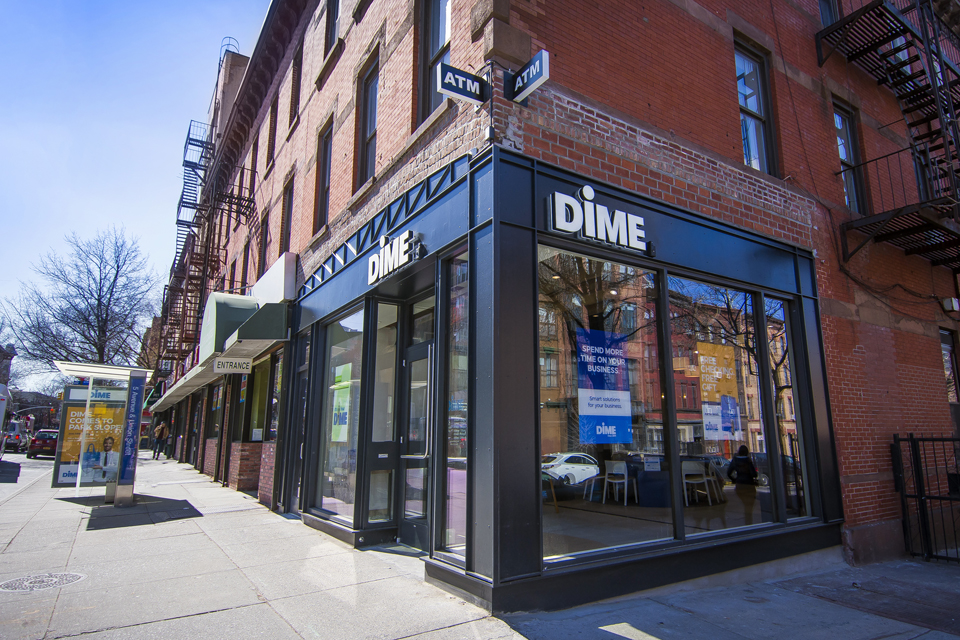
- Park Slope branch of Dime Commercial Bank
- Type: Public
- Traded as: NYSE: DCOM
- Industry: Banking
- Founded: 1864; 162 years ago
- Headquarters: Hauppauge, New York, U.S.
- Number of locations: 60+ branches (2021)
- Area served: Bronx, Brooklyn, Manhattan, Nassau, Queens, Suffolk, and Lakewood, New Jesey(Lakewood).
- Services: Financial services, real estate loans
- Net income: US$103,996,000
- Total assets: US$12,347,085,000
- Total equity: US$1,140,522,000
- Number of employees: 800+
- Website: dime.com

The Dime Commercial Bank, originally known as the Dime Savings Bank of Williamsburgh, is a local, FDIC-insured bank headquartered in Hauppauge, New York. Founded in 1864, the bank was originally based in the Williamsburg neighborhood of Brooklyn, New York, and continues to operate with a strong market presence in the area. In 2017, Dime moved its headquarters to Brooklyn Heights. On Monday, February 1, 2021, Bridge Bancorp Inc. (BNB Bank) and Dime Commercial Bancshares (Dime Commercial Bank) successfully closed on a merger of equals. The bank headquarters is currently in Hauppauge, NY.

== History ==
Dime Commercial Bank first opened in Brooklyn on June 1, 1864. Founded by William Grandy, Dime was established as a mutual savings bank serving the growing immigrant and low-income populations in the area.

Dime weathered a series of economic ups and downs as conditions in Williamsburg changed, finally incorporating and becoming a publicly traded company on June 26, 1996. At the same time, Dime acquired Conestoga Bancorp, Inc. and its wholly owned subsidiary, Pioneer Savings Bank, making it the first simultaneous IPO/acquisition of its kind in the nation.

In 1999, Dime acquired Financial Bancorp, Inc. (Financial Federal Savings Bank) for $74 million.

The bank is a wholly owned subsidiary of Dime Commercial Bancshares, Inc. (NYSE: DCOM), a publicly owned company. Dime Commercial Bancshares posted $6.7 billion in consolidated assets as of December 31, 2020. Dime finished among the top 5 on the S&P Global Market Intelligence thrift ranking ("S&P Global") for 9 consecutive years, from 2009 to 2017.

In 2017, Dime began to shift their focus to commercial and business banking. In August 2017, Dime announced they had been approved as a Small Business Administration (SBA) lender. The CEO, Kenneth J. Mahon, said, “the launch of our SBA lending program continues the expansion of our Business Banking division...We recognize that small businesses and entrepreneurs are important to the economic vibrancy of the communities we serve.”

Dime Commercial Bank operates 60+ branches throughout the New York metropolitan area in Brooklyn, Queens, the Bronx, Nassau, and Suffolk Counties.

In 2025, Dime announced the opening of its first location in Lakewood, situated in Lakewood, New Jersey (Lakewood).

== Notable buildings ==
Dime Commercial Bank's first location was in the basement of the First National Bank Building at the base of the Williamsburg Bridge, where it opened on June 1, 1864. Having outgrown the First National Bank building, Dime moved its headquarters to a new development in the Williamsburg Bridge Plaza on the corner of Havemeyer and South 5th Street. On January 16, 2017, Dime moved to its next headquarters at 300 Cadman Plaza West, Brooklyn, NY. Bank offices are now located in Hauppauge, NY.

The Havemeyer Street building at 209 Havemeyer Street (or 257 South 5th Street) was designated a New York City landmark by the New York City Landmarks Preservation Commission on March 27, 2018. The building was constructed in 1906–08, and was designed in the Neoclassical style by the firm of Helmle & Huberty.
