= Glenn Research Center =

NASA research facility in Ohio

NASA John H. Glenn Research Center at Lewis Field
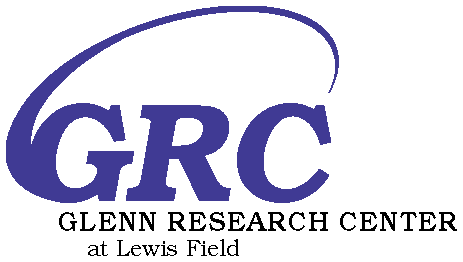

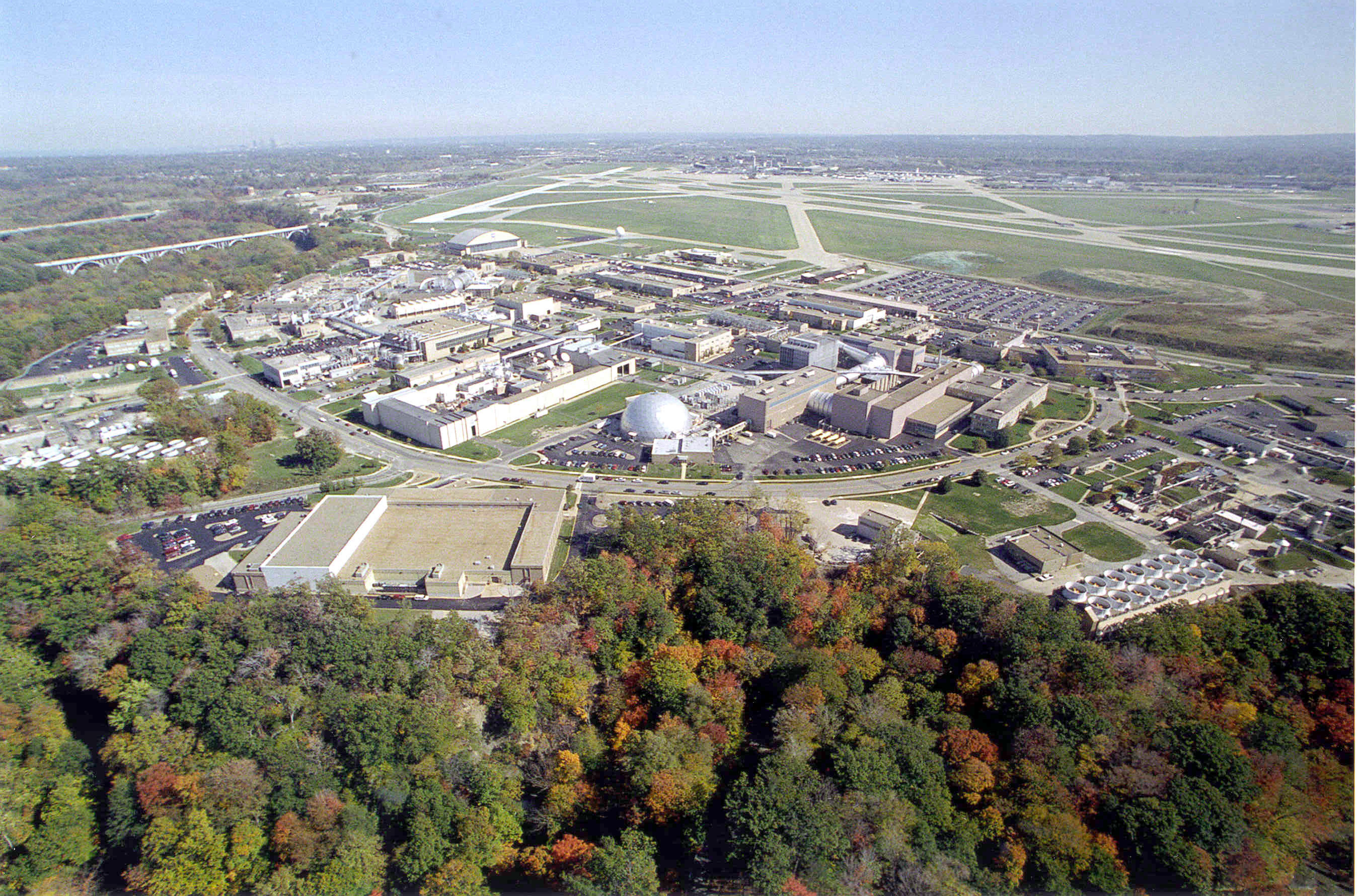
- Aerial view of Glenn Research Center at Lewis Field

Agency overview
- Formed: 1942
- Preceding agencies: Aircraft Engine Research Laboratory; NASA Lewis Research Center
- Jurisdiction: Federal government of the United States
- Headquarters: Brook Park, Ohio, U.S.; 41.412843°N 81.862399°W
- Agency executive: Dawn Schaible, director
- Parent agency: NASA
- Child agency: Neil A. Armstrong Test Facility
- Website: nasa.gov/glenn

NASA John H. Glenn Research Center at Lewis Field is a NASA center within the cities of Brook Park and Cleveland between Cleveland Hopkins International Airport and the Rocky River Reservation of Cleveland Metroparks, with a subsidiary facility in Sandusky, Ohio. Its director is Dawn Schaible. Glenn Research Center is one of ten major NASA facilities, whose primary mission is to develop science and technology for use in aeronautics and space. As of May 2012, it employed about 1,650 civil servants and 1,850 support contractors on or near its site.

In 2010, the formerly on-site NASA Visitors Center moved to the Great Lakes Science Center in the North Coast Harbor area of downtown Cleveland.

== History ==
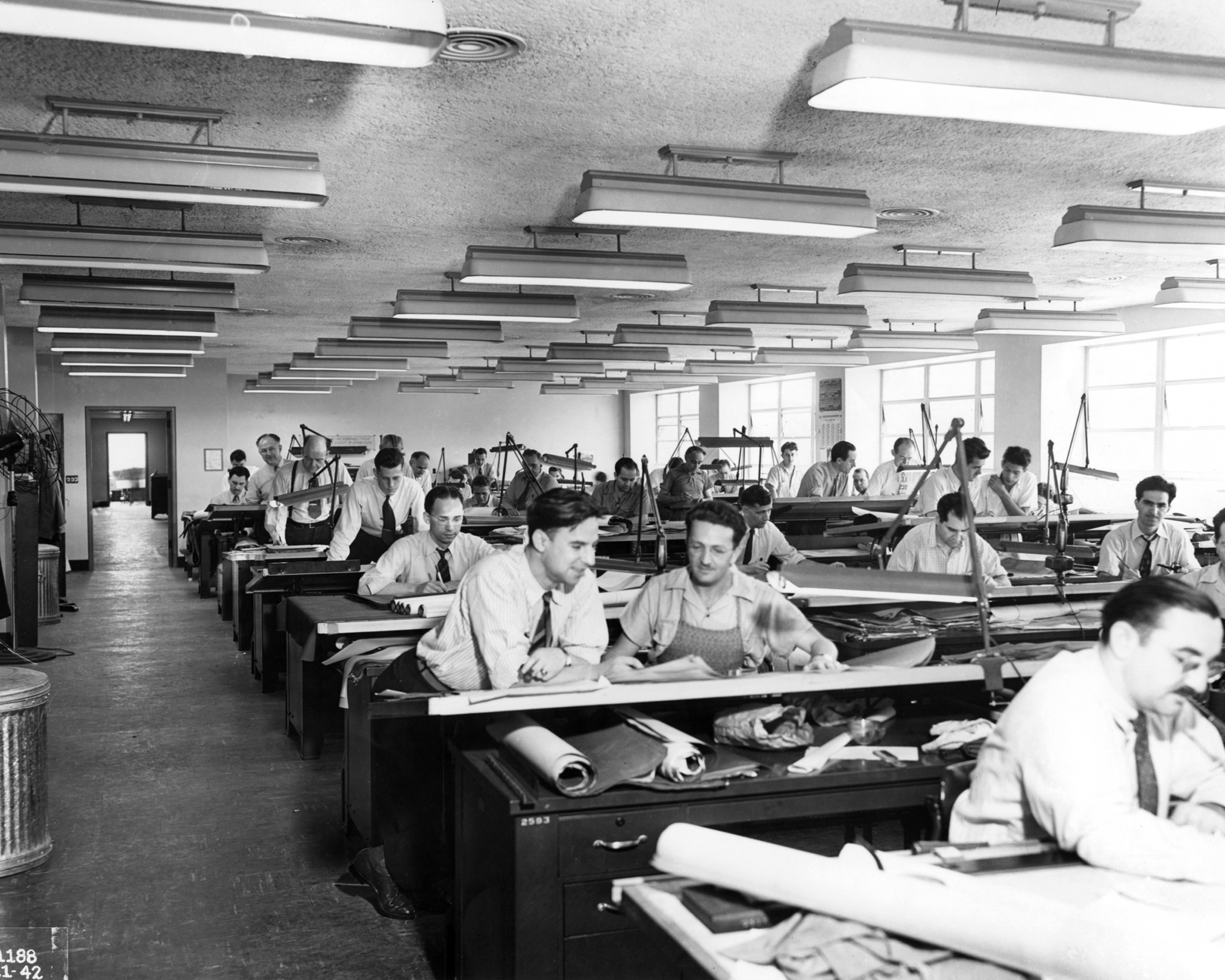
The drafting room at the Aircraft Engine Research Laboratory in 1942.

The installation was established in 1942 as part of the National Advisory Committee for Aeronautics (NACA) and was later incorporated into the National Aeronautics and Space Administration as a laboratory for aircraft engine research.

It was first named the Aircraft Engine Research Laboratory after funding was approved in June 1940. It was renamed the Flight Propulsion Research Laboratory in 1947, the Lewis Flight Propulsion Laboratory (LFPL) in 1948 (after George W. Lewis, the head of NACA from 1919 to 1947), and the NASA Lewis Research Center in 1958.

On March 1, 1999, the center was officially renamed the NASA John H. Glenn Research Center at Lewis Field, in honor of John Glenn, who was a fighter pilot, astronaut (the first American to orbit the Earth) and a politician.

As early as 1951, researchers at the LFPL were studying the combustion processes in liquid rocket engines.

== Facilities ==
=== Neil A. Armstrong Test Facility ===
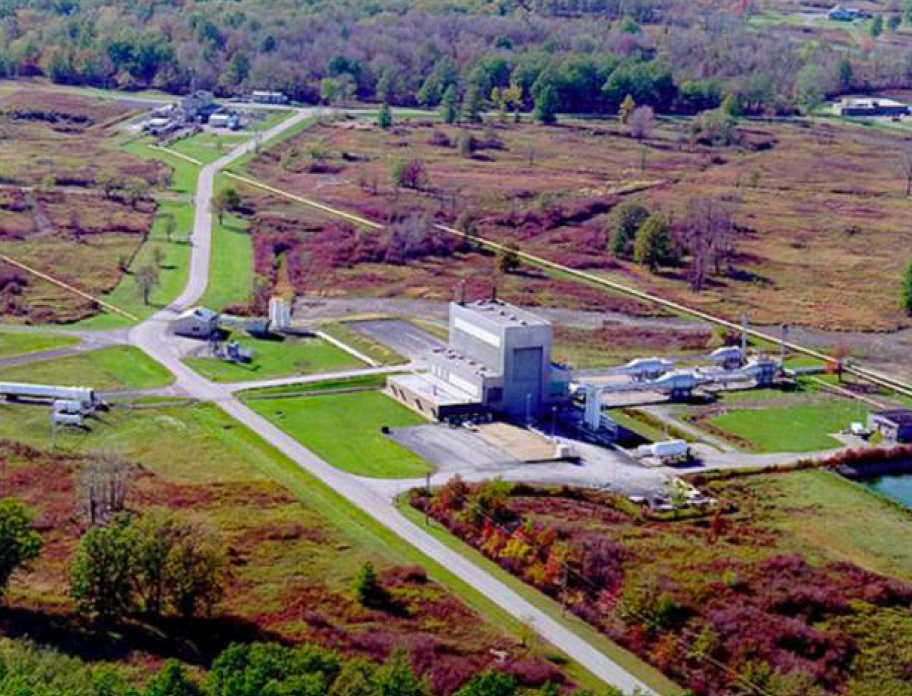
GRC Armstrong Spacecraft Propulsion Facility (B-2)

The 6,400-acre (2,600 ha) NASA John H. Glenn Research Center at the Neil A. Armstrong Test Facility or just Neil A. Armstrong Test Facility, formerly the NASA John H. Glenn Research Center at Plum Brook Station or just Plum Brook Station, in southern Erie County, Ohio, near Sandusky, is also part of Glenn (41°20′59.4″N 82°39′01.8″W). It is located about 50 miles (80 km) from the main campus. It specializes in very large scale tests that would be hazardous on the main campus.

As of 2025, the station consists of five major facilities:

- Space Environments Complex
- In-Space Propulsion Facility
- Combined Effects Chamber
- Hypersonic Tunnel Facility
- NASA Electric Aircraft Testbed

The Plum Brook Reactor was decontaminated and decommissioned under a 2008 cost-plus-fee contract valued at more than $33.5 million.

In 2019 the U.S. senators from Ohio, Rob Portman and Sherrod Brown, proposed to rename Plum Brook Station after Neil Armstrong. The legislation was signed into law on December 30, 2020, and Plum Brook Station was renamed the Neil A. Armstrong Test Facility.

==== B-2 Spacecraft Propulsion Research Facility ====
The B-2 Spacecraft Propulsion Research Facility is the world's only facility capable of testing full-scale, upper-stage launch vehicles and rocket engines under simulated high-altitude conditions. The Space Power Facility houses the world's largest space environment vacuum chamber.

=== Icing Research Tunnel ===
The icing Research Tunnel is a wind tunnel capable of simulating atmospheric icing condition to test the effect of ice accretion on aircraft wings and body as well as to test anti-icing systems for aircraft.

=== Zero Gravity Research Facility ===
The Zero Gravity Research Facility is a vertical vacuum chamber used for dropping experiment payloads for testing in microgravity. It enables the investigation of the behavior of components, systems, liquids, gases, and combustion when dropped in vacuum.

The facility consists of a concrete-lined shaft, 28 feet (8.5 m) in diameter, that extends 510 feet (160 m) below ground level. An aluminum vacuum chamber, 20 feet (6.1 m) in diameter and 470 feet (140 m) high, is contained within the concrete shaft. The pressure in this vacuum chamber is reduced to 13.3 newtons per square meter (1.3×10^{−4}atm) before use.

The facility also includes a smaller drop tower with a free fall time of 2.2 seconds and a much lower cost per drop. It is used for the Dropping in a Microgravity Environment (DIME) and What if No Gravity (WING) educational programs.

The facility was designated a National Historic Landmark in 1985. It has been the world's largest microgravity facility since the 2003 closing of the Japan Microgravity Centre.

== Developments ==
=== Aeronautics science and technology ===
NASA Glenn does research and technology development on jet engines, producing designs that reduce energy consumption, pollution, and noise. The chevrons it developed for noise reduction appear on many commercial jet engines today, including those used on the Boeing 787 Dreamliner.

=== Space science and technology ===
The Glenn Research Center, along with companies it has hired, are credited with the following:

- The liquid hydrogen rocket engine, which Wernher von Braun called the critical technology that allowed the Apollo Moon landings.
- The Centaur upper-stage rocket
- The gridded ion thruster, a high-efficiency engine for spaceflight. A Glenn-derived ion engine was used on the NASA probe Deep Space 1.
- The Electrical Power System for Space Station Freedom. A slightly modified version is used on the International Space Station.
- The Universal Stage Adapter for the planned Block 1B iteration of the Space Launch System (SLS).

== Contributions ==
NASA Glenn's core competencies are:

- Air-breathing propulsion
- Communications technology and development
- Space propulsion and cryogenic fluids management
- Power, energy storage, and conversion
- Materials and structures for extreme environments

=== Education ===
The Glenn Research Center is home to the Lewis' Educational and Research Collaborative Internship Program (LERCIP). It provides internships for high school and college students and high school teachers. The high school program is an eight-week internship for sophomores and juniors with interests in science, technology, engineering, math, or professional administration. The college level consists of a 10-week internship and is open to college students at all levels. Only residents of the Cleveland area are eligible for high school LERCIP, but college LERCIP is open to students nationwide. Interns work closely with their NASA mentors and are involved in the daily activities of the center. They are expected to be available to work 40 hours a week for the duration of the internship. The LERCIP Teacher program is a 10-week internship for educators in STEM fields.

==== Other ====
The Dropping In Microgravity Environment is an annual contest held yearly by the center. Teams of high school students write proposals for experiments to be performed in the Drop Tower. The winners travel to the center, perform their experiments, and submit a research report to NASA.

== Future ==
After 2004, NASA had been shifting its focus towards space exploration as mandated by the Vision for Space Exploration. Because of this, it was perceived by some that regional NASA centers like Glenn, which focus on research and technology, were becoming more and more marginalized in terms of resources and relevance. However, on May 13, 2006, it was announced that NASA Glenn Research Center had secured management of the Crew Exploration Vehicle's service module, which promised to generate billions of dollars and hundreds of jobs for the center. This work secured the center's future in the near term, and signalled a shift in priority for the center from aeronautical research to space exploration, aligning itself closer with NASA's new mission.

Another change of direction created uncertainty in 2010, however, when President Obama and Congress declared the end of the Vision for Space Exploration and sought to chart a new course for human space flight and NASA. However, the 2015 budget for NASA made substantial increases to projects in which the Research Center participates, such as aeronautics research, planetary science and space technology, and some of that funding was expected to flow down to the center.

== Center directors ==
These people served as the director of the Glenn Research Center:

No.	Image	Director	Start	End	Notes
1		Edward "Ray" Sharp	May 1942	June 1947	Manager, NACA Aircraft Engine Research Laboratory
1		Edward "Ray" Sharp	June 1947	September 1948	Director, NACA Aircraft Engine Research Laboratory,
1		Edward "Ray" Sharp	September 1948	September 1958	NACA Lewis Flight Propulsion Laboratory
1		Edward "Ray" Sharp	October 1, 1958	December 31, 1960	Director NASA LeRC
Acting		Eugene J. Manganiello	January 1, 1961	October 31, 1961	
2		Abe Silverstein	November 1, 1961	October 31, 1969	
3		Bruce T. Lundin	November 1, 1969	August 26, 1977	
Acting		Bernard Lubarsky	August 27, 1977	September 30, 1978	
4		John F. McCarthy Jr.	October 1, 1978	June 21, 1982	
5		Andrew J. Stofan	June 22, 1982	June 29, 1986	
Acting		John M. Klineberg	June 30, 1986	May 28, 1987	
6		John M. Klineberg	May 29, 1987	June 30, 1990	
7		Lawrence J. Ross	July 1, 1990	February 28, 1994	
8		Donald J. Campbell	March 1, 1994	September 30, 2003	
9		Julian M. Earls	October 1, 2003	December 25, 2005	
10		Woodrow Whitlow Jr.	December 25, 2005	February 2010	
Acting		Ramon Lugo III	March 1, 2010	July 17, 2010	
11		Ramon Lugo III	July 18, 2010	January 3, 2013	
12		James M. Free	January 4, 2013	March 13, 2016	
13		Janet L. Kavandi	March 14, 2016	September 31, 2019	
Acting		Marla E. Perez-Davis	October 1, 2019	January 23, 2020	
14		Marla E. Perez-Davis	January 24, 2020	June 17, 2022	
Acting		James A. Kenyon	June 17, 2022	November 6, 2022	
15		James A. Kenyon	November 7, 2022	present	

== NASA Glenn Visitor Center ==
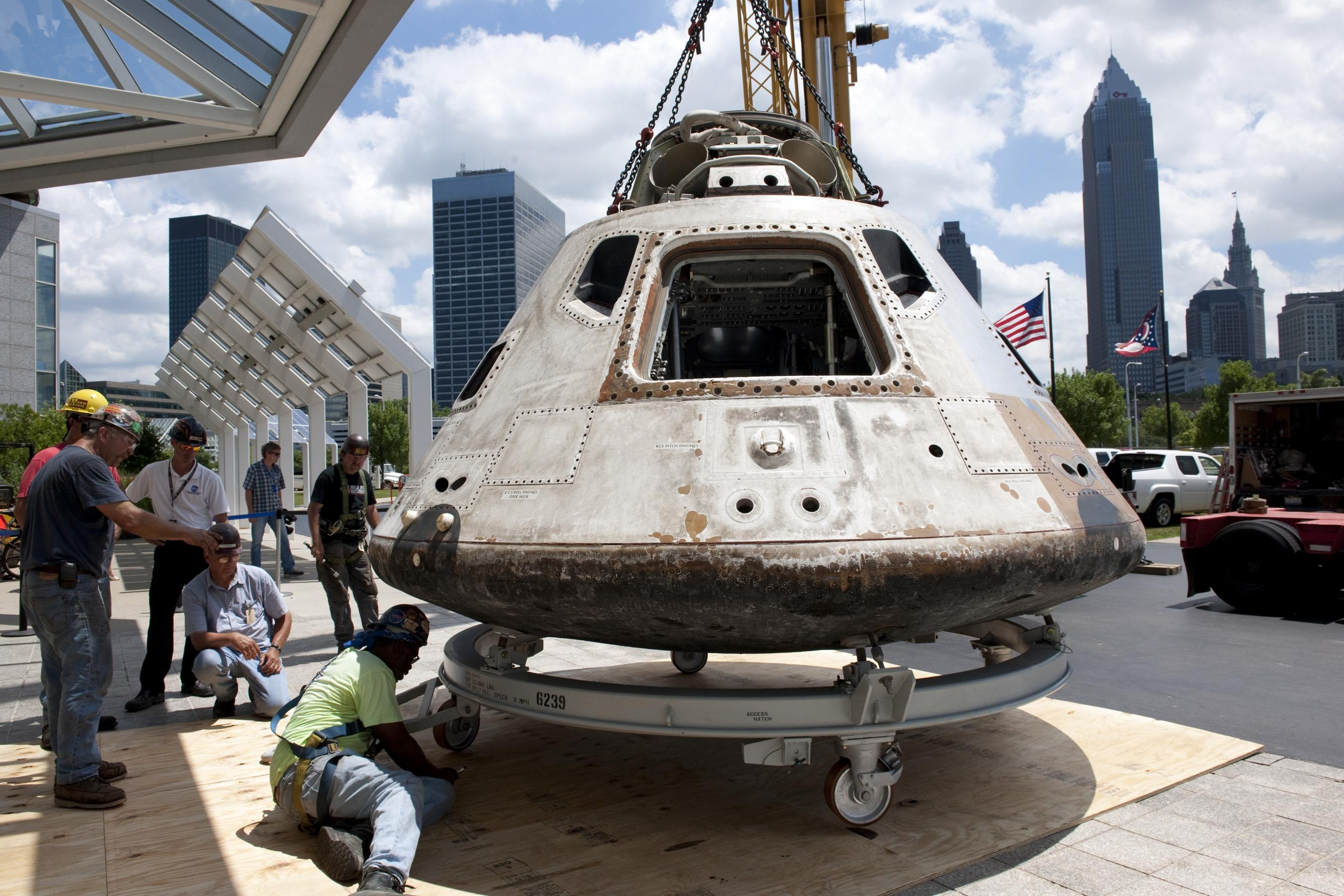
The Apollo Command Module of the 1973 Skylab 3 mission being moved to the Great Lakes Science Center

In September 2009, the Glenn Research Center closed its Visitor Center and sent many of its displays to the Great Lakes Science Center. The move was intended to reduce the public-relations budget; provide easier access to the general public, especially the under-served community; and bring the NASA Glenn facility more public exposure by putting the displays at the much more visited science center in Cleveland. Compared to the 60,000 visitors per year at its former site, the new Glenn Visitor Center section of the Great Lakes Science Center drew 330,000 visitors in its first year.

The NASA Glenn Research Center offers public tours of its research facilities on the first Saturday of each month. Reservations must be made in advance.

== See also ==
- NASA Environmental Management System
