= NSWR =

NSWR may refer to:

- New South Wales Government Railways
- Nuclear salt-water rocket
