= Steam rocket =

Thermal rocket that uses superheated water held in a pressure vessel

A steam rocket (also known as a hot water rocket) is a thermal rocket that uses water held in a pressure vessel at a high temperature, such that its saturated vapor pressure is significantly greater than ambient pressure. The water is allowed to escape as steam through a rocket nozzle to produce thrust.

Steam rockets are usually pressure fed, but more complex designs using solar energy or nuclear energy have been proposed. They are probably best known for their use in rocket-powered cars and motorcycles, and they are the type used in aeolipile.

== Principle of operation ==
Water, while under pressure, is heated up to a high temperature (approx. 250–500 °C). As the hot water goes through the nozzle (usually a de Laval nozzle) and the pressure reduces, the water flashes to steam pressing on the nozzle, and leaving at high speed. By the recoil the rocket accelerates in the opposite direction to the steam. The nozzle of hot water rockets must be able to withstand high pressure, high temperatures and the particularly corrosive nature of hot water.

The simplest design has a pressurised water tank where the water is heated before launch; however, this gives a very low exhaust velocity since the high latent heat of vaporization means that very little actual steam is produced and the exhaust consists mostly of water, or if high temperatures and pressures are used, then the tank is very heavy.

More complex designs can involve passing the water through pumps and heat exchangers and employing nuclear reactors or solar heating; it is estimated that these can give a specific impulse of over 195 s I_{sp}, which is still well below the standards of more complex designs, for example the 465 s of the hydrogen-oxygen Vinci engine.

== Applications ==
- An aeolipile is pushed around by steam rockets
- Vacuum ejectors, with steam-powered motive rocket nozzles, are used to provide vacuum in industry
- Evel Knievel's 1974 Skycycle X-2 Snake River Canyon jump used a steam rocket designed by Robert Truax
- Walt Arfons's "Neptune I" dragster, also used a steam rocket designed by Robert Truax
- Hot water rockets are used occasionally as auxiliary launch aids and for experimentation purposes.
- "Mad" Mike Hughes, American daredevil, manned and launched his steam powered rocket on March 25, 2018, to a height of 1,875 feet (572 m). He died during a later launch on the 22 February 2020. The launch event was being filmed for the Science Channel television series Homemade Astronauts, in which Hughes was to star.

== Proposed uses ==
Solar or nuclear heated steam thermal rockets have been proposed for use in interplanetary travel. Although the performance is low, high mass fractions are easy to achieve, and water is expected to be very easy to extract and purify from ice deposits that are found around the Solar System.

== Popular culture ==
Steam rockets have occasionally appeared in science fiction stories, especially steampunk. Examples include the 2004 film Steamboy and the 2015 novel Seveneves.

== See also ==
- Walter HWK 109-500 and Walter HWK 109-507, German WW II rocket boosters whose T-Stoff monopropellant fuel exhausted from them as superheated steam
- Nuclear salt-water rocket
- Water rocket
- Rocket engine
- Jet engine
