= Homemade Astronauts =

American television show

- Country of origin: United States
- Original language: English
- No. of seasons: 1
- No. of episodes: 4

Production
- Executive producers: Jeremy Simmons; Tom Campbell; Fenton Bailey; Elizabeth A. Decker; Randy Barbato
- Running time: 1-hour timeslot
- Production company: World of Wonder

Original release
- Network: Discovery+
- Release: 13 May 2021

Homemade Astronauts is a television show on Science Channel (Discovery Science USA) and Discovery+ that debuted in 2021. It featured three self financed teams, who design and build their own equipment, in an attempt to reach the edge of space. The people are average Americans building on their farms, ranches, garages, and backyards.

== History ==
Mike Hughes reached 1,875 feet (572 m) altitude in a manned steam rocket in 2018, filmed for the series, setting a record for an amateur manned rocket.

Discovery Networks gave the greenlight for full series production in 2019, for airing on The Science Channel in 2020.

In February 2020, during filming of an attempt by Mike Hughes to reach 5,000 ft (1,500 m) or 1 mi (1.6 km) in altitude, the steam rocket crashed on landing, killing Hughes.

In March 2020, the show filmed an attempt by Kurt Anderson to break the world ice speed record in his rocket sled Arctic Arrow using a peroxide rocket, with the Rocketboys team. The attempt resulted in a crash that destroyed the dragster sled, reaching 241 mph (388 km/h), short of the record of 247 mph (398 km/h).

Season 1 began airing in May 2021, having been filmed over 2.5 years, for a total of 4 episodes. Season 1 carries a dedication 'This series is dedicated to Michael "Mad Mike" Hughes 1956-2020', and uses the title crawl "The ~~new~~DIY space race is here. ~~Tech giants~~Everyday people are making history. They're using their ~~billions~~credit cards to fund their dreams."

== Cast ==
Cast featured on the show include:

Team Hughes/Stakes

- Mike Hughes, professional daredevil, wannabe astronaut
- Waldo Stakes, vehicle designer; builder of Hughes' manned rocket
- Stephanie, Waldo's daughter and team member

The Rocketboys (Team Michaelson/Anderson)

- Ky Michaelson, SFX artist, stuntman, and founder of the Civilian Space eXploration Team — the first amateur group to build a rocket which crossed the Kármán line
- Kurt Anderson, Rocketboys mechanical engineer, and Arctic Arrow rocket sled dragster pilot, wannabe astronaut
- David, Rocketboys electronics engineer
- Buddy Michaelson, son of Ky, Rocketboys parachute expert

Pacific Space Flight (Team Smith)

- Cameron Smith, doctor of anthropology and archaeology, Portland State University anthropology professor, built his own pressure suit to pilot his balloon to the edge of space.
- Majorie, a student and part of Team Smith

== Teams ==
Teams shown include:

- The Rocketboys: (Team Michaelson/Anderson) using a solid fuel rocket; attempting to build a crewed space rocket to reach the edge of space (50 mi (80 km)), the McDowell Line (Note: McDowell Limit: 50 miles up, the edge of space recognized by the U.S. government, by USAF/FAA/NASA, and used by Virgin Galactic as the edge of space)
- Team Hughes/Stakes, using a balloon launch steam rocket rockoon to reach 62 mi (100 km) up, the Kármán Line (Note: Kármán Limit: 100 km up, the edge of space recognized internationally by the FAI, and used by Blue Origin as the edge of space)
- Pacific Space Flight: (Team Smith) using a balloon; to reach the Armstrong Line (63,000 ft (19,000 m) or 20 km (12 mi)), in a high altitude balloon (Note: Armstrong Limit: FL630, the edge of the atmosphere where pressure suits are required to prevent bodily fluids from boiling; used by balloon-based space tourism companies as the edge of space)

== Episodes ==
No.	Title	Original release date	Prod. code
1	"I Want to Go to Space"	13 May 2021	TBA
2	"Full Tilt Boogie"	13 May 2021	TBA
3	"Remember the Hindenburg"	13 May 2021	TBA
4	"Maybe This is the Day"	13 May 2021	TBA

== See also ==
- Civilian Space eXploration Team
- Ansari X-Prize
- Billionaire space race
- Space 2.0
