= Pulsed nuclear thermal rocket =

Type of nuclear thermal rocket

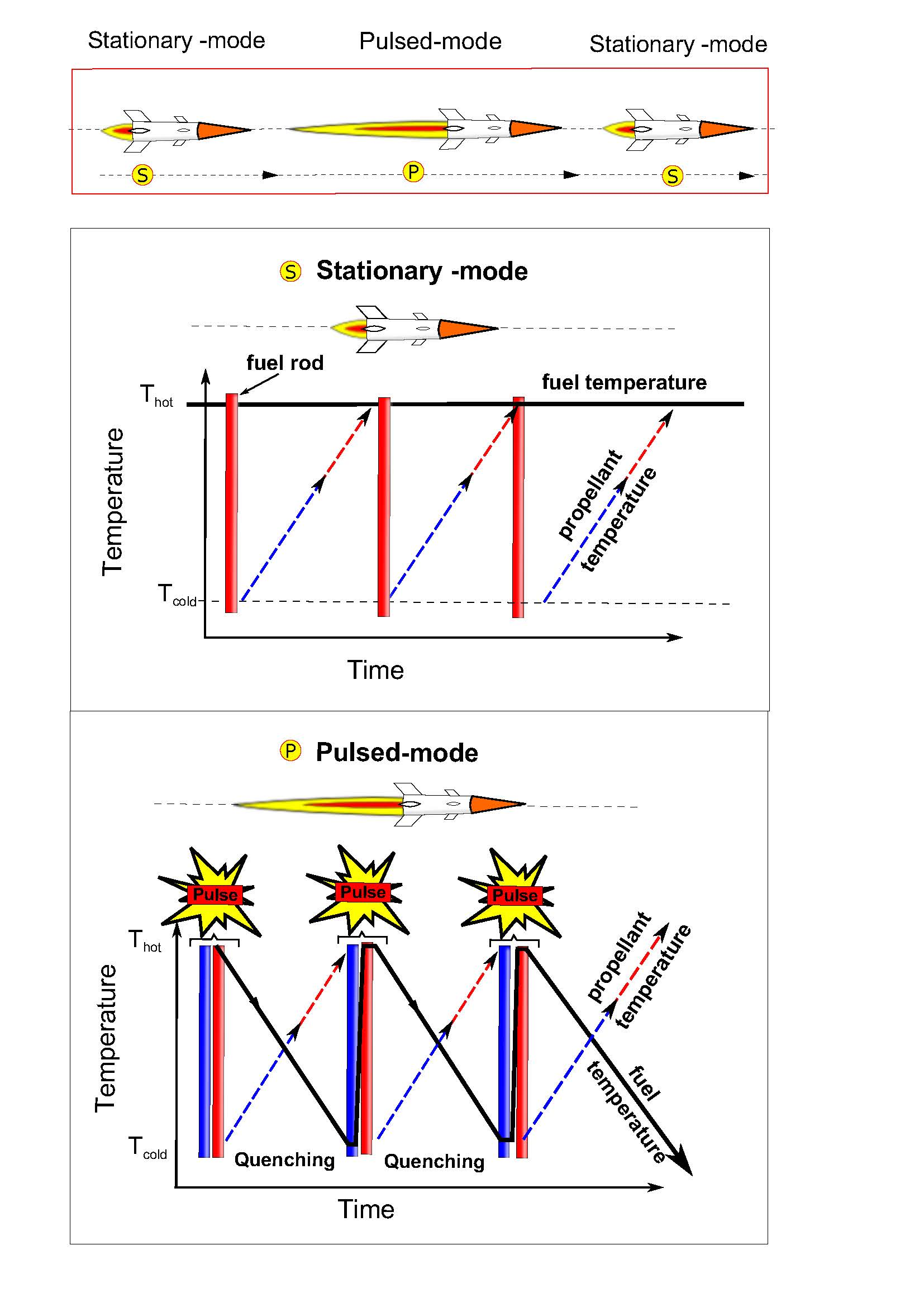
A sequence for a stationary-pulsed-stationary maneuver for a pulsed thermal nuclear rocket. During the stationary mode (working at constant nominal power), the fuel temperature is always constant (solid black line), and the propellant is coming cold (blue dotted lines) heated in the chamber and exhausted in the nozzle (red dotted line). When amplification in thrust or specific impulse is required, the nuclear core is "switched on" to a pulsed mode. In this mode, the fuel is continuously quenched and instantaneously healed by the pulses. Once the requirements for high thrust and specific impulse are not required, the nuclear core is "switched on" to the initial stationary mode.

A pulsed nuclear thermal rocket is a type of nuclear thermal rocket (NTR) concept developed at the Polytechnic University of Catalonia, Spain, and presented at the 2016 AIAA/SAE/ASEE Propulsion Conference for thrust and specific impulse (I_{sp}) amplification in a conventional nuclear thermal rocket.

The pulsed nuclear thermal rocket is a bimodal rocket able to work in a stationary (at constant nominal power as in a conventional NTR), and as well as a pulsed mode as a TRIGA-like reactor, making possible the production of high power and an intensive neutron flux in short time intervals. In contrast to nuclear reactors where velocities of the coolant are no larger than a few meters per second and thus, typical residence time is on seconds, however, in rockets chambers with subsonic velocities of the propellant around hundreds of meters per second, residence time are around $10^{-2}s$ to :$10^{-3}s$ and then a long power pulse translates into an important gain in energy in comparison with the stationary mode. The gained energy by pulsing the nuclear core can be used for thrust amplification by increasing the propellant mass flow, or using the intensive neutron flux to produce a very high specific impulse amplification – even higher than the fission-fragment rocket, wherein the pulsed rocket the final propellant temperature is only limited by the radiative cooling after the pulsation.

== Statement of the concept ==
A rough calculation for the energy gain by using a pulsed thermal nuclear rocket in comparison with the conventional stationary mode is as follows. The energy stored into the fuel after a pulsation is the sensible heat stored because the fuel temperature increase. This energy may be written as

$$E_\text{pulse} = c_fM_f \Delta T$$

where:

$E_\text{pulse}$ is the sensible heat stored after pulsation,
$c_f$ is the fuel heat capacity,
$M_\text{f}$ is the fuel mass,
$\Delta T$ is the temperature increase between pulsations.

On the other hand, the energy generated in the stationary mode, i.e., when the nuclear core operates at nominal constant power is given by

$$E_\text{stationary} = \chi_ll t$$

where:

$\chi_l$ is the linear power of the fuel (power per length of fuel),
$l$ is the length of the fuel,
$t$ is the residence time of the propellant in the chamber.

Also, for the case of cylindrical geometries for the nuclear fuel we have

$$M_f= \pi R_f^2l\rho_f$$

and the linear power given by

$$\chi_l= 4\pi\kappa_f(T_f-T_s)$$

Where:

$R_f$ is the radius of the cylindrical fuel,
$\rho_f$ the fuel density,
$\kappa_f$ the fuel thermal conductivity,
$T_f$ is the fuel temperature at the center line,
$T_s$ is the surface or cladding temperature.

Therefore, the energy ratio between the pulsed mode and the stationary mode, $N=\frac{E_\text{pulse}}{E_\text{stationary}}$ yields

$$N= \frac{c_f\rho_f R_f^2}{4\pi\kappa_f(T_f-T_s)}\left[\frac{\Delta T}{t}  \right]$$

Where the term inside the bracket, $\left[\frac{\Delta T}{t} \right]$ is the quenching rate.

Typical average values of the parameters for common nuclear fuels as MOX fuel or uranium dioxide are: heat capacities, thermal conductivity and densities around $c_f\simeq 300J/(mol\cdot K)$,$\kappa_f\simeq 6W/(K\cdot m^2)$ and $\rho_f\simeq 10^4 kg/(m^3)$, respectively., with radius close to $R_f\simeq 10^{-2} m$, and the temperature drop between the center line and the cladding on $T_f-T_s=600 K$ or less (which result in linear power on $\chi_l\simeq 45000 W/m)$. With these values the gain in energy is approximately given by:

$$N\simeq  6\times 10^{-3}\left[\frac{\Delta T}{t}  \right]$$

where $\left[\frac{\Delta T}{t} \right]$ is given in $K/s$. Because the residence time of the propellant in the chamber is on $10^{-3} s$ to $10^{-2} s$ considering subsonic velocities of the propellant of hundreds of meters per second and meter chambers, then, with temperatures differences on $\Delta T \simeq 10^3 K$ or quenching rates on $\left[\frac{\Delta T}{t}\right] \simeq 10^6 K/s$ energy amplification by pulsing the core could be thousands times larger than the stationary mode. More rigorous calculations considering the transient heat transfer theory shows energy gains around hundreds or thousands times, i.e., $10^2\leq N\leq 10^3$.

Quenching rates on $\left[\frac{\Delta T}{t}\right]\geq 10^6 K/s$ are typical in the technology for production of amorphous metal, where extremely rapid cooling in the order of $10^6 K/s \leq \left[\frac{\Delta T}{t}\right]\leq 10^7 K/s$ are required.

== Direct thrust amplification ==
The most direct way to harness the amplified energy by pulsing the nuclear core is by increasing the thrust via increasing the propellant mass flow.

Increasing the thrust in the stationary mode -where power is fixed by thermodynamic constraints, is only possible by sacrificing exhaust velocity. In fact, the power is given by

$$P = \frac{1}{2}F v_\text{e}$$

where $P$ is the power, $F$ is the thrust and $v_\text{e}$ the exhaust velocity. On the other hand, thrust is given by

$$F= \dot{m}_\text{p} v_\text{e}$$

where $\dot{m}_\text{p}$ is the propellant mass flow. Thus, if it is desired to increase the thrust, say, n-times in the stationary mode, it will be necessary to increase $n^2$-times the propellant mass flow, and decreasing $\frac{1}{n}$-times the exhaust velocity. However, if the nuclear core is pulsed, thrust may be amplified $n$-times by amplifying the power $n$-times and the propellant mass flow $n$-times and keeping constant the exhaust velocity.

== I_{sp} amplification ==
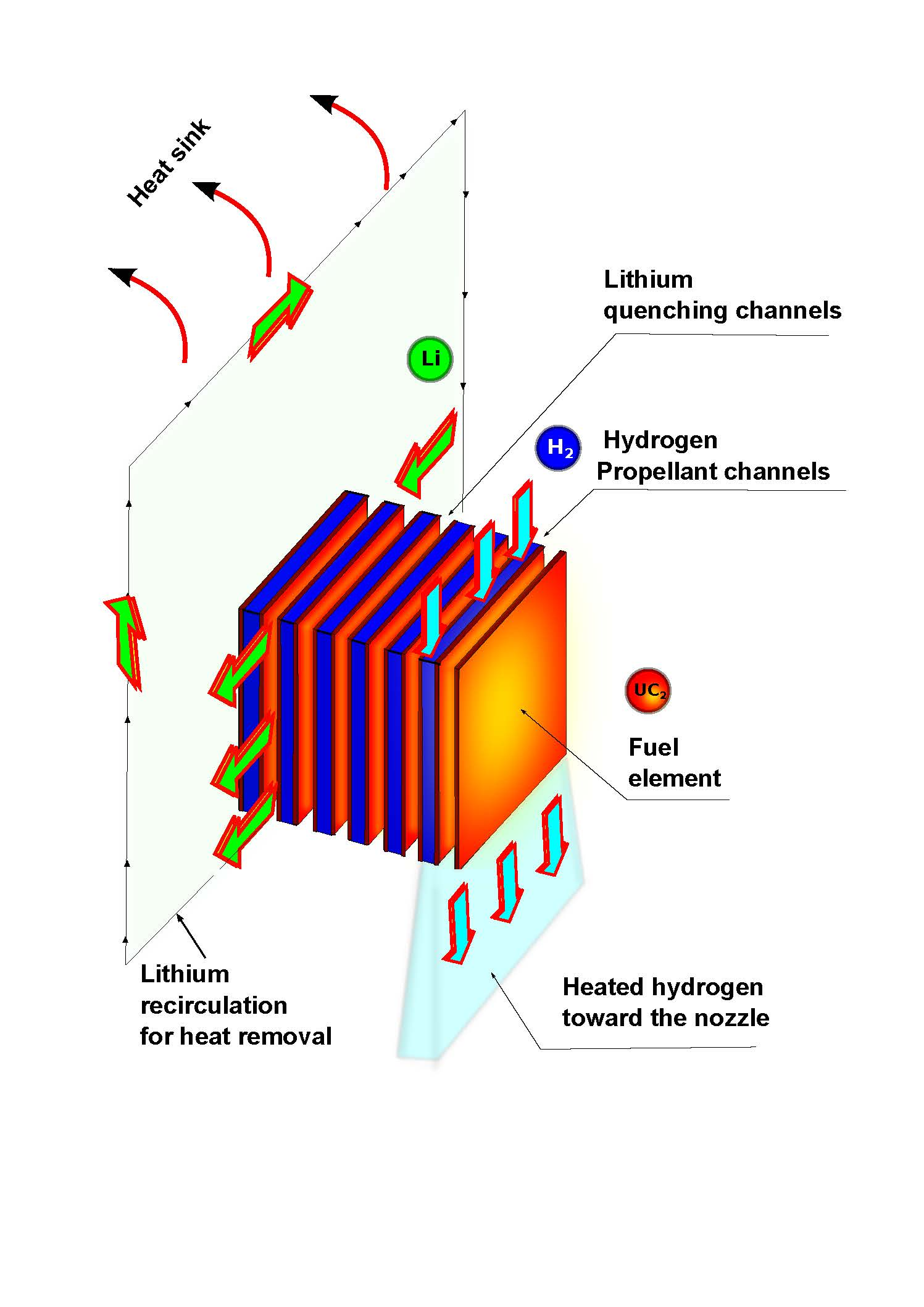
Pulsed nuclear thermal rocket unit cell concept for I_{sp} amplification. In this cell, hydrogen-propellant is heated by the continuous intense neutronic pulses in the propellant channels. At the same time, the unwanted energy from the fission fragments is removed by a solitary cooling channel with lithium or other liquid metal.

The attainment of high exhaust velocity or specific impulse (I_{sp}) is the first concern. The most general expression for the I_{sp} is given by

$$I_\text{sp} \simeq  c\sqrt{T}$$

being $c$ a constant, and $T$ the temperature of the propellant before expansion. However, the temperature of the propellant is related directly with the energy as $E\simeq kT$, where $k$ is the Boltzmann constant. Thus,

$$I_\text{sp} \simeq  c'\sqrt{E}$$

being $c'$ a constant.

In a conventional stationary NTR, the energy $E$ for heating the propellant is almost from the fission fragments which encompass almost 95% of the total energy, and the faction of energy from prompt neutrons $f_\text{n}$ is only around 5%, and therefore, in comparison, is almost negligible. However, if the nuclear core is pulsed it is able to produce $N$ times more energy than the stationary mode, and then the fraction of prompt neutrons or $f_\text{n}N$ could be equal or larger than the total energy in the stationary mode. Because fast neutrons created in fission events have very high neutron temperature (2 MeV or 20,000 km/s on average), they are capable of exchanging very large amounts of kinetic energy. Neutrons also exchange kinetic energy much more readily with nucleons of similar mass, so low molar mass propellant can absorb most of it while the heavy atoms in fuel are mostly unaffected. This allows temperatures to be obtained in the propellant that are higher than in the fuel, potentially by orders of magnitude, enabling I_{sp} far beyond what a standard nuclear thermal rocket is capable of.

In summary, if the pulse generates $N$ times more energy than the stationary mode, the I_{sp} amplification is given by

$$I_\text{sp} \simeq  I_\text{sp,o}\sqrt{f_\text{n}N+1}$$

Where:

$I_\text{sp}$ is the amplified specific impulse,
$I_\text{sp,o}$ the specific impulse in the stationary mode,
$f_\text{n}$ the fraction of prompt neutrons,
$N$ the energy amplification by pulsing the nuclear core.

With values of $N$ between $10^2$ to $10^3$ and prompt neutron fractions around $f_\text{n}\simeq\frac{1}{20}$, , the hypothetical $I_\text{sp}$ amplification attainable makes the concept specially interesting for interplanetary spaceflight.

== Advantages of the design ==
There are several advantages relative to conventional stationary NTR designs. Because the neutron energy is transported as kinetic energy from the fuel into the propellant, then a propellant hotter than the fuel is possible, and therefore the $I_\text{sp}$ is not limited to the maximum temperature permissible by the fuel, i.e., its melting temperature.

The other nuclear rocket concept which allows a propellant hotter than the fuel is the fission fragment rocket. Because it directly uses the fission fragments as a propellant, it can also achieve a very high specific impulse.

== Other considerations ==
For $I_\text{sp}$ amplification, only the energy from prompt neutrons, and some prompt gamma energy, is used for this purpose. The rest of the energy, i.e., the almost $95\%$ from fission fragments is unwanted energy and must be continuously evacuated by a heat removal auxiliary system using a suitable coolant. Liquid metals, and particularly lithium, can provide the fast quenching rates required. One aspect to be considered is the large amount of energy which must be evacuated as residual heat (almost 95% of the total energy). This implies a large dedicated heat transfer surface.

As regards the mechanism for pulsing the core, the pulsed mode can be produced using a variety of configurations depending on the desired frequency of the pulsations. For instance, the use of standard control rods in a single or banked configuration with a motor driving mechanism or the use of standard pneumatically operated pulsing mechanisms are suitable for generating up to 10 pulses per minute. For the production of pulses at rates up to 50 pulsations per second, the use of rotating wheels introducing alternately neutron poison and fuel or neutron poison and non-neutron poison can be considered. However, for pulsations ranking the thousands of pulses per second (kHz), optical choppers or modern wheels employing magnetic bearings allow to revolve at 10 kHz. If even faster pulsations are desired it would be necessary to make use of a new type of pulsing mechanism that does not involve mechanical motion, for example, lasers (based on the 3He polarization) as early proposed by Bowman, or proton and neutron beams. Frequencies on the order of 1 kHz to 10 kHz are likely choices.

== See also ==
- Fission fragment rocket
- Plasma propulsion engine
