= Radioisotope rocket =

A radioisotope rocket or radioisotope thermal rocket is a type of thermal rocket engine that uses the heat generated by the decay of radioactive elements to heat a working fluid, which is then exhausted through a rocket nozzle to produce thrust. They are similar in nature to nuclear thermal rockets such as NERVA, but are considerably simpler and often have no moving parts. Alternatively, radioisotopes may be used in a radioisotope electric rocket, in which energy from nuclear decay is used to generate the electricity used to power an electric propulsion system.

The basic idea is a development of existing radioisotope thermoelectric generator, or RTG, systems, in which the heat generated by decaying nuclear fuel is used to generate power. In the rocket application the generator is removed, and the working fluid is instead used to produce thrust directly. Temperatures of about 1,500 to 2,000 °C (2,700 to 3,600 °F) are possible in this system, allowing for specific impulses of about 700 to 800 seconds (7 to 8 kN·s/kg), about double that of the best chemical engines such as the LH2-LOX Space Shuttle Main Engine.

However the amount of power generated by such systems is typically fairly low. Whereas the full "active" reactor system in a nuclear thermal rocket can be expected to generate over a gigawatt, a radioisotope generator might get 5 kW. This means that the design, while highly efficient, can produce thrust levels of perhaps 1.3 to 1.5 N (0.29 to 0.34 lbf), making them useful only for thrusters. In order to increase the power for medium-duration missions, engines would typically use fuels with a short half-life such as polonium-210, as opposed to the typical RTG which would use a long half-life fuel such as plutonium-238 in order to produce more constant power over longer periods of time.

Another drawback to the use of radioisotopes in rockets is an inability to change the operating power. The radioisotope constantly generates heat that must be safely dissipated when it is not heating a propellant. Reactors, on the other hand, can be throttled or shut down as desired.

== Technology development ==
TRW maintained a fairly active development program known as Poodle from 1961 to 1965, and today the systems are still often known as Poodle thrusters. The name was a play on the larger systems being developed under Project Rover, which led to NERVA. In April 1965 they ran their testbed engine for 65 hours at about 1,500 °C (2,700 °F), producing a specific impulse of 650 to 700 seconds (6.5 to 7 kN·s/kg).

== Thermal thorium rocket ==
A proposal in 2020 suggested the use of cascade-decaying isotopes in radioisotope rockets. These isotopes produce radioactive daughter products with much shorter half-lives than the parent isotope, allowing multiple successive decay events within the fuel material over a relatively short period of time. Several isotopes were proposed for such applications, including thorium-228, radium-228, actinium-227, and uranium-232.

Because the decay chains release energy through several consecutive radioactive decays, these isotopes possess extremely high specific thermal power. For example, thorium-228 produces approximately 180 W/g compared to approximately 0.54 W/g for plutonium-238 used in current RTGs. The proposal suggested that this could enable significantly higher operating temperatures and potentially higher specific impulse than conventional radioisotope-based propulsion concepts. Operating temperatures approaching 3000 K were proposed using tungsten and thorium oxide ceramic structural components, which could also provide partial shielding against gamma radiation emitted by the decay chain.

Due to the extremely high operating temperature, the proposal also suggested a "lightbulb" operating mode, in which heat transfer to the propellant would occur primarily through thermal radiation rather than direct thermal contact. The high emissivity and high-temperature stability of thorium oxide ceramics were considered advantageous for such a configuration.

== Photon pressure ==
Even without an exhaust, the photon pressure of the energy emitted by a thermal source can produce thrust, although an extremely tiny amount. A famous example of spacecraft thrust due to photon pressure was the Pioneer anomaly, in which photons from the onboard radioisotope source caused a tiny but measurable acceleration of the Pioneer spacecraft.

A similar phenomenon occurred on the New Horizons spacecraft; photons (thermal infrared) from the RTG, reflected from the spacecraft's antenna, produced a very small thrust which propelled the spacecraft slightly off course.

== See also ==
- Nuclear thermal rocket – Nuclear spacecraft propulsion technology
- Radioisotope heater unit – Device that provides heat through radioactive decay
- Spacecraft propulsion – Method used to accelerate spacecraft
- Thermal rocket – Rocket engine
