= Mike Hughes (daredevil) =

American daredevil and flat-Earther (1956–2020)

- Hughes in 2019
- Born: February 9, 1956; Oklahoma City, Oklahoma, U.S.
- Died: February 22, 2020 (aged 64); Barstow, California, U.S.
- Cause of death: Crash of self-built rocket
- Other name: "Mad" Mike Hughes
- Occupations: Limousine driver, stunt performer
- Known for: Amateur crewed rocketry; Professed flat-Earther
- Website: https://madmikehughes.com/

Michael Jay Hughes (February 9, 1956 – February 22, 2020), popularly known as "Mad" Mike Hughes, was an American limousine driver, professed flat-Earther, and daredevil known for flying in self-built steam rockets. He died while filming a stunt for a Science Channel television series. Although a public promoter of the flat Earth model, following his death his public relations representative said that Hughes had only used flat Earth as a PR stunt to acquire funding for his rockets.

== Background ==
Hughes was born and spent his childhood in Oklahoma City. He started racing motorcycles at age 12 and later competed on the AMA Pro Flat Track racing circuit. During the 1980s, he worked as part of a NASCAR pit crew, and he moved to working as a limousine driver in the 1990s.

In 2002, Hughes set a Guinness World Record with a 103-foot (31 m) jump in a Lincoln Town Car stretch limousine. He stated, during an interview with the Associated Press in 2018, that he had planned to run for Governor of California.

At the time of his death, Hughes had no close relatives, and lived by himself in Apple Valley, California.

== Rocket launches ==
=== 2014 launch ===
According to the Associated Press, Hughes built his first crewed rocket and on January 30, 2014, flew 1,374 feet (419 m) in just over one minute over Winkelman, Arizona. According to CBC News, Hughes collapsed after the landing and required three days to recover; he stated that the injuries suffered from the flight put him in a walker for two weeks. Because there was no footage of Hughes entering the craft, some doubts were raised regarding whether he was on board during the launch. He collaborated with Waldo Stakes to design steam rockets.

=== Flat-Earth rocket fundraising and launch ===
In 2016, Hughes launched a failed fundraising attempt for a rocket that raised $310. After professing his belief in a flat Earth later that year, Hughes gained support within the flat-Earth community. His post-flat-Earth fundraising campaign made its $7,875 goal. He stated that he intended to make multiple rocket journeys, culminating in a flight to outer space, where he believed he would be able to take a picture of the Earth as a flat disc.

In November 2017, Hughes said that the Bureau of Land Management (BLM) had given him verbal permission to launch his rocket, pending approval from the Federal Aviation Administration. However, a BLM spokesman stated its local field office had no record of speaking to Hughes, and that the agency had reached out to him with concerns after seeing news reports. The rocket launch was postponed from November 25, 2017, to December 2, 2017, due to permit issues. Hughes moved his launch pad 4 miles (6 km) to take off and land on private property, though the BLM maintained he still required permits. Hughes stated that the dispute would not stop him from flying: "I'm a daredevil. I'm not much for authority or rules."

The initial rocket was intended to reach a speed of 500 mph (800 km/h); further rocket trips, intended to launch from a balloon 20 miles (32 km) up, were meant to achieve suborbital spaceflight. Hughes acknowledged the risks, telling the Associated Press: "It's scary as hell. But none of us are getting out of this world alive." Following a malfunction during a live-streamed attempt on February 3, 2018, Hughes completed a launch on March 24, 2018. He reached a height of 1,875 feet (572 m) and made a hard landing in the Mojave Desert. The rocket launched at a sharp angle to avoid landing on public land, and Hughes' team reported a maximum speed of 350 mph (560 km/h). Hughes reported no serious injuries.

=== Planned 2019 launch ===
Hughes planned to launch himself in a rocket again on August 10, 2019, but mechanical troubles and treatment for heat exhaustion postponed the event.

=== 2020 launch and death ===
On February 22, 2020, Hughes died near Barstow, California, following the crash of a steam-powered rocket he was piloting, which was built by Hughes and Stakes. During launch, the rocket's landing parachute deployed early and detached from the craft. A witness, freelance journalist Justin Chapman, stated that the rocket appeared to rub against the launch apparatus, which may have torn the parachutes. The event was being filmed for the Science Channel television series Homemade Astronauts, in which Hughes was to star.

=== Motivation ===
Following Hughes' death, his public relations representative, Darren Shuster, stated: "We used flat Earth as a PR stunt... Flat Earth allowed us to get so much publicity that we kept going! I know he didn’t believe in flat Earth and it was a schtick." Science writer Mick West also stated that from his conversations with Hughes, "he was not driven by seeking to explain that the earth is flat but rather wanted to use the topic to promote his stuntman career." Conversely, Michael Linn, a partner on the documentary Rocketman: Mad Mike's Mission to Prove the Flat-Earth, said he believed Hughes' statements were genuine.

== In popular culture ==
Hughes appeared in the music video for the Death Valley Girls' song "One Less Thing (Before I Die)". The video was directed by Kansas Bowling and featured footage of his rocket launch in Apple Valley.

Hughes was the focus of the 2019 documentary Rocketman: Mad Mike's Mission to Prove the Flat-Earth. He also appeared in the 2019 mockumentary FLAT EARTH: To The Edge And Back by Logan Paul, and was attempting to sue over his appearance in the film at the time of his death.

== See also ==
- Amateur rocketry
- Homebuilt aircraft
- List of inventors killed by their own invention
