= Fission fragment reactor =

Type of nuclear reactor

Similar to how the fission-fragment rocket produces thrust, a fission fragment reactor is a nuclear reactor that generates electricity by decelerating an ion beam of fission byproducts instead of using nuclear reactions to generate heat. By doing so, it bypasses the Carnot cycle and can achieve efficiencies of up to 90% instead of 40-45% attainable by efficient turbine-driven thermal reactors. The fission fragment ion beam would be passed through a magnetohydrodynamic generator to produce electricity.

Fission fragment reactor designs generally have several common components. The reactor chamber contains a high surface area nuclear fuel to both facilitate direct emission of fission fragments and assist in cooling the fuel. Generally, if fuels subject to criticality are used instead of those that naturally decay (as in a nuclear battery), a moderator is typically involved as well. A magnetic mirror induced by an axial magnetic field typically collates the fragments into a beam that can then be decelerated to generate power. The rate the particles decelerate at depends on their energy; as a consequence, the deceleration process also can help provide isotopic separation as an automatic reprocessing stage. The potential could exist for conventional nuclear waste to be processed via the use of fission fragment reactors.

An earlier design by scientists at Idaho National Engineering Laboratory and Lawrence Livermore National Laboratory involved the concept of coating fine carbon wires with fissionable fuel. While this had a high surface area, it proved not enough to radiate the heat absorbed during the reactions, so their design was modified to rotate long wires through the core, giving them time to cool.

A later design by Rodney A. Clark and Robert B. Sheldon involves the use of a dusty plasma of electrostatically suspended fuel nanoparticles in the core. This increases the surface area enough to allow for effective radiative cooling. As the particles naturally ionize as fission occurs, electrostatic suspension is a simple process.

== Direct energy conversion ==
In the early 2000s, research was undertaken by Sandia National Laboratories, Los Alamos National Laboratory, The University of Florida, Texas A&M University and General Atomics to use direct conversion to extract energy from fission reactions. Essentially, attempting to extract energy from the linear motion of charged particles coming off a fission reaction.
