= Project Prometheus =

NASA nuclear electric propulsion project 2003–2006

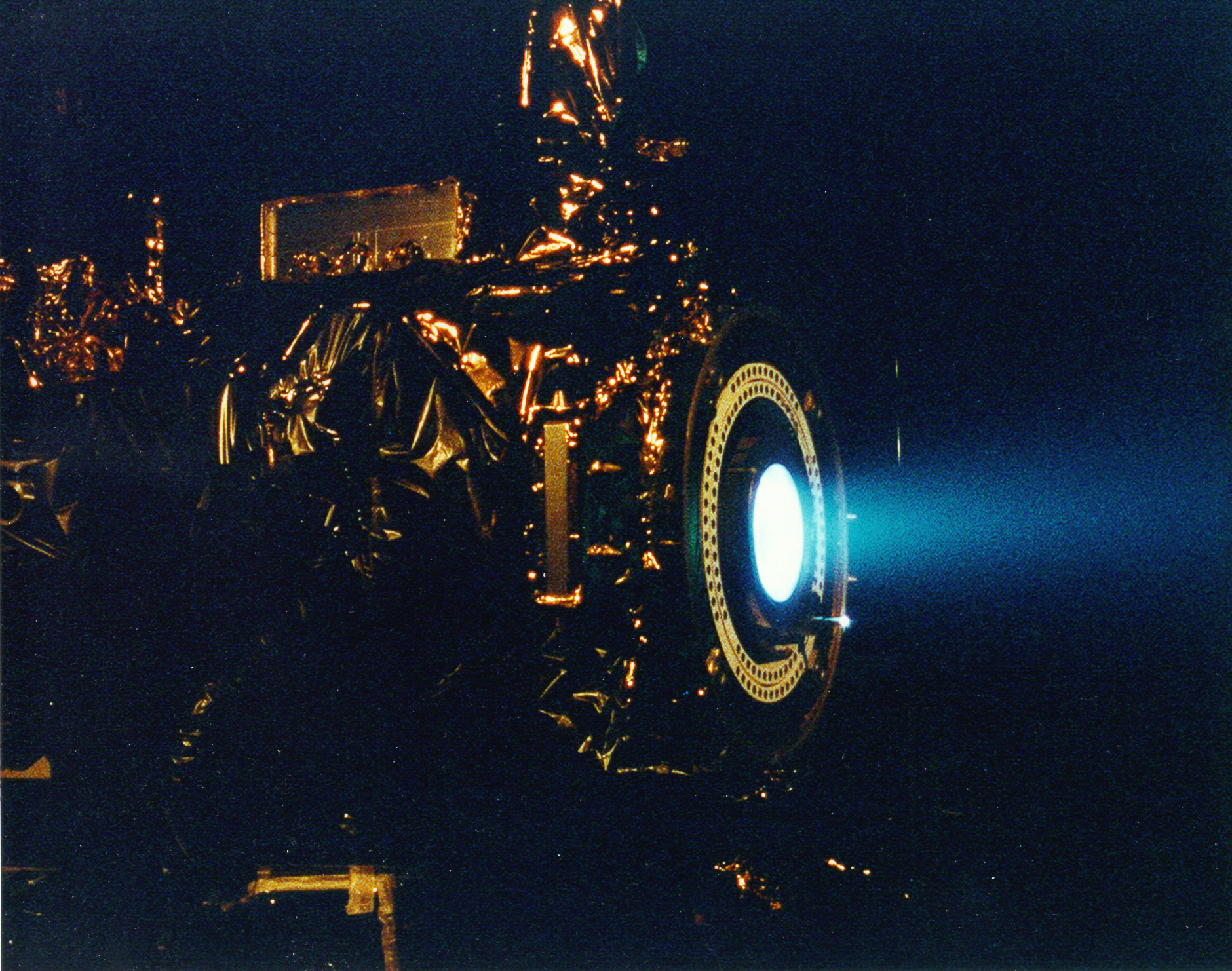
Nuclear reactors could be used to power ion engines such as this one used on Deep Space 1.

Project Prometheus (also known as Project Promethian) was established in 2003 by NASA to develop nuclear-powered systems for long-duration space missions. This was NASA's first serious foray into nuclear spacecraft propulsion since the cancellation of the SNTP project in 1995. The project was planned to design, develop, and fly multiple deep space missions to the outer planets.

The project was cancelled in 2005, due to other demands on NASA's budget. Its budget shrank from $252.6 million in 2005 to only $100 million in 2006, $90 million of which was for closeout costs on cancelled contracts. As of NASA's fiscal year 2026 budget, no funding has been allocated to further nuclear propulsion research.

== Namesake ==
Originally named the "Nuclear Systems Initiative", Project Prometheus was named for the wisest of the Titans in Greek mythology who gave the gift of fire to humanity. NASA said the name Prometheus indicates its hopes of establishing a new tool for understanding nature and expanding capabilities for the exploration of the Solar System.

== Motivations ==
Due to their distance from the Sun, spacecraft exploring the outer planets are severely limited in that they cannot use solar power as a source of electrical energy for onboard instrumentation or for ion propulsion systems. Previous missions to the outer planets such as the Voyager program and Galileo probe have relied on radioisotope thermoelectric generators (RTGs) as their primary power source. Unlike RTGs which rely on heat produced by the natural decay of radioactive isotopes, Project Prometheus called for the use of a small nuclear reactor as the primary power source.

The primary advantages of this would have been:

- Increased power generation compared to RTGs, allowing scientists and engineers more flexibility in both mission design and operations.
- Increased spacecraft longevity.
- Increased range and propulsion power.
- Extra power for high speed data transmission.

== Missions ==
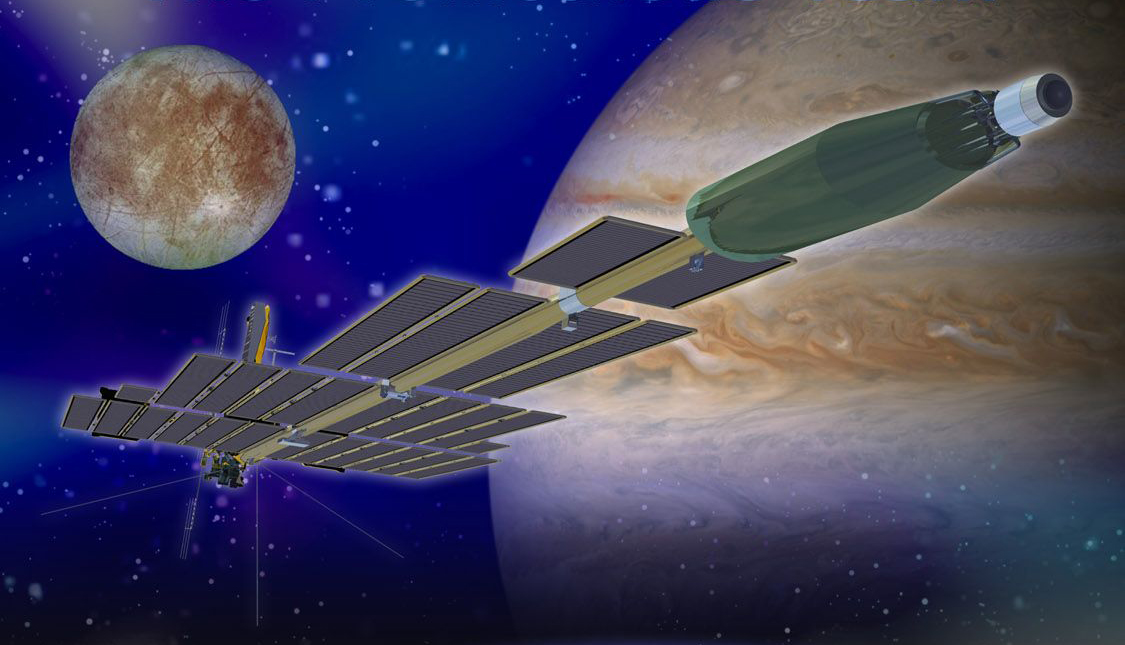
Prometheus I (Jupiter Icy Moons Orbiter)

Missions planned to involve Prometheus Nuclear Systems and Technology included:

- Jupiter Icy Moons Orbiter, originally planned to be the first mission of Project Prometheus, it was deemed too complex and expensive, and its funding was cut in the 2006 budget. NASA instead considered a demonstration mission to a target closer to Earth to test out the reactor and heat rejection systems, possibly with a spacecraft scaled down from its original size.

== Technology ==
Project Prometheus was focused on Nuclear electric propulsion:

Development of spacecraft powered by nuclear reactors to generate electricity. Brayton cycle turboalternators were selected for power generation. This electricity would then be used to run ion engines. It did not study nor pursue nuclear thermal propulsion (e.g. NERVA).

NASA's Prometheus reactor was to be built by the U.S. Department of Energy's Office of Naval Reactors in Washington, D.C., per an agreement signed in August 2004. The reactor would have generated 200,000 watts of power for the propulsion and instruments of a spacecraft.

== Collaboration ==
The project was managed by Jet Propulsion Laboratory (JPL). Spacecraft design contracts were awarded to Boeing, Lockheed-Martin, and Northrop Grumman.

Project Prometheus would have had substantial involvement of the U.S. Department of Energy (DOE).

Naval Reactors, which oversees the nuclear reactor program of the U.S. Navy, was to participate in the design and construction of the reactors for the Jupiter Icy Moons Orbiter (JIMO).

In addition to Knolls Atomic Power Laboratory in Schenectady, New York, Bettis Laboratory in Pittsburgh, Pennsylvania, and other supporting Department of Energy national laboratories participated in the Prometheus cooperation.

In September 2004, JPL chose Northrop Grumman Space Technology to co-design the projected Prometheus spacecraft. The awarded contract was worth around $400 million.

== See also ==
- Knolls Atomic Power Laboratory
- Bettis Atomic Power Laboratory – American facility in Pittsburgh, Pennsylvania
- Demonstration Rocket for Agile Cislunar Operations (DRACO) – U.S. Space Nuclear Thermal Propulsion
- Gerald Feinberg, author of The Prometheus Project (1969)
- Magnetoplasmadynamic thruster – Form of electrically powered spacecraft propulsion
- NERVA – US Nuclear thermal rocket engine project (1956–1973)
- Nuclear fission
- Project Orion (nuclear propulsion) – Discontinued US research program on the viability of nuclear pulse propulsion
- Project Rover – U.S. project to build a nuclear thermal rocket
