= Kevin L.G. Parkin =

American British scientist (born 1977)

Kevin L.G. Parkin (born 1977 in London) is an American-British scientist who is best known for his study of beamed energy propulsion.

== Areas of interest ==
Rocket propulsion and gasdynamics, high power microwaves and directed energy, object-oriented software engineering, space mission design. Since 2016, Kevin has served as the systems director of Breakthrough Starshot, a $100M initiative to send a beam-driven probe to Alpha Centauri within the next generation.

== Education ==
Parkin attended the University of Leicester, where he received his bachelor's degree in physics in 1999. He then attended graduate school at the California Institute of Technology, where he received his master's degree in science in 2001. He completed his Ph.D. at Caltech in 2006, from which he derived his research for beam energy.

== Career ==
Parkin was previously a member of the Carnegie Mellon Silicon Valley Research Staff and previously Deputy Director of the Mission Design Center at NASA Ames, and project lead for the Microwave Thermal Rocket. Beginning with his Ph.D. thesis on Microwave Thermal Propulsion, his work spans theoretical, computational and experimental domains for the general problem of space access and economics. In July 2005, he was awarded the Korolev Medal by the Russian Federation of Cosmonautics.

He founded the NASA Ames Mission Design Center (MDC) and developed its software architecture. The Ames MDC was the first of its kind to make extensive use of groupware, for example in pooling knowledge to create and maintain spacecraft parts databases. Another innovation was the use of a centralized parametric mission design archive that enables realtime concurrent design collaboration and object-oriented style 'inheritance' of missions to promote reuse of designs and the growth of design trees.

In 2010, Parkin was tapped by the NASA Ames Center Director to manage the 100 year Starship study for NASA and DARPA.

Parkin is a member of the Institute of Physics (IOP).

== Patents and selected publications ==
- Parkin, K.L.G, and Culick, F.E.C, The Microwave Thermal Rocket, Journal of Spacecraft and Rockets, in preparation.
- Parkin, K.L.G, The Microwave Thermal Thruster and its Application to The Launch Problem. Ph.D thesis, June 2006.
- Kevin L.G. Parkin, Joel C. Sercel, Michael Liu, Daniel P. Thunnissen, ICEMakerT: An Excel-Based Environment for Collaborative Design, IEEE Aerospace Conference, March 8–15, 2003, Big Sky, MT. -- IEEEAC Paper #1564.
- K.L.G Parkin. A Microwave Heat-Exchange Thruster and Method of Operation the Same. - U.S. Patent 6993898
