= Thermal rocket =

Rocket engine

A thermal rocket is a rocket engine that uses a propellant that is externally heated before being passed through a nozzle to produce thrust, as opposed to being internally heated by a redox (combustion) reaction as in a chemical rocket.

Thermal rockets can theoretically give high performance, depending on the fuel used and design specifications, and a great deal of research has gone into a variety of types. However, aside from the simple cold gas thruster and steam rocket, none have proceeded past the testing stage.

== Theory ==
For a rocket engine, the efficiency of propellant use (the amount of impulse produced per mass of propellant) is measured by the specific impulse ($I_\text{sp}$), which is proportional to the effective exhaust velocity. For thermal rocket systems, the specific impulse increases as the square root of the temperature, and inversely as the square root of the molecular mass of the exhaust. In the simple case where a thermal source heats an ideal Monatomic gas reaction mass, the maximum theoretical specific impulse is directly proportional to the thermal velocity of the heated gas:

$$I_\text{sp} = V_{e}/g_0 = \frac{1}{g_0} \sqrt{\frac{3k_\text{B}T}{m}}$$

where $g_0$ is the standard gravity, $k_\text{B}$ is the Boltzmann constant, $T$ the temperature (absolute), and m is the mass of the exhaust (per molecule). For reaction mass which is not monatomic, some of the thermal energy may be retained as internal energy of the exhaust, and this equation will be modified depending on the degree of dissociation in the exhaust, frozen-flow losses, and other internal losses, but the overall square-root proportionality will remain. A more detailed equation for the maximum performance of a thermal rocket can be found under de Laval nozzle or in Chung.

Thus, the efficiency of a thermal engine is maximized by using the highest feasible temperature (usually limited by materials properties), and by choosing a low molecular mass for the reaction mass.

== Cold gas thruster ==
The simplest case of a thermal rocket is the case in which a compressed gas is held in a tank, and is released through a nozzle. This is known as a cold gas thruster. The thermal source, in this case, is simply the energy contained in the heat capacity of the gas.

== Steam rocket ==
A steam rocket (also known as a "hot water rocket") is a thermal rocket that uses water held in a pressure vessel at a high temperature, such that its saturated vapor pressure is significantly greater than ambient pressure. The water is allowed to escape as steam through a rocket nozzle to produce thrust. This type of thermal rocket has been used in drag-racing applications.

== Nuclear thermal rocket ==
In a nuclear thermal rocket a working fluid, usually liquid hydrogen, is heated to a high temperature in a nuclear reactor, and then expands through a rocket nozzle to create thrust. The nuclear reactor's energy replaces the chemical energy of the reactive chemicals in a chemical rocket engine. Due to the higher energy density of the nuclear fuel compared to chemical fuels, about 10^{7} times, the resulting specific impulse of the engine is at least twice as good as chemical engines. The overall gross lift-off mass of a nuclear rocket is about half that of a chemical rocket, and hence when used as an upper stage it roughly doubles or triples the payload carried to orbit.

A nuclear engine was considered for some time as a replacement for the J-2 used on the S-II and S-IVB stages on the Saturn V and Saturn I rockets. Originally "drop-in" replacements were considered for higher performance, but a larger replacement for the S-IVB stage was later studied for missions to Mars and other high-load profiles, known as the S-N. Nuclear thermal translunar or interplanetary space "shuttles" were planned as part of the Space Transportation System to take payloads from a propellant depot in low Earth orbit to the Moon and other planets. Robert Bussard proposed the Single-Stage-To-Orbit "Aspen" vehicle using a nuclear thermal rocket for propulsion and liquid hydrogen propellant for partial shielding against neutron back scattering in the lower atmosphere. The Soviets studied nuclear engines for their own Moon rockets, notably upper stages of the N-1, although they never entered an extensive testing program like the one the U.S. conducted throughout the 1960s at the Nevada Test Site. Despite many successful firings, American nuclear rockets did not fly before the space race ended.

To date, no nuclear thermal rocket has flown, although the NERVA NRX/EST and NRX/XE were built and tested with flight design components. The highly successful U.S. Project Rover which ran from 1955 through 1972 accumulated over 17 hours of run time. The NERVA NRX/XE, judged by SNPO to be the last "technology development" reactor necessary before proceeding to flight prototypes, accumulated over 2 hours of run time, including 28 minutes at full power. The Russian nuclear thermal rocket RD-0410 was also claimed by the Soviets to have gone through a series of tests at the nuclear test site 50.170°N 78.375°E near Semipalatinsk.

The United States tested twenty different sizes and designs during Project Rover and NASA's NERVA program from 1959 through 1972 at the Nevada Test Site, designated Kiwi, Phoebus, NRX/EST, NRX/XE, Pewee, Pewee 2 and the Nuclear Furnace, with progressively higher power densities culminating in the Pewee (1970) and Pewee 2. Tests of the improved Pewee 2 design were cancelled in 1970 in favor of the lower-cost Nuclear Furnace (NF-1), and the U.S. nuclear rocket program officially ended in spring of 1973. Research into nuclear rockets has continued quietly since that time within NASA. Current (2010) 25,000 pound-thrust reference designs (NERVA-Derivative Rockets, or NDRs) are based on the Pewee, and have specific impulses of 925 seconds.

=== Radioisotope thermal rocket ===
A variant is the radioisotope thermal rocket, in which the reaction mass is heated by a radioisotope heat source instead of a nuclear reactor.

== Solar thermal rocket ==
Solar thermal propulsion is a form of spacecraft propulsion that makes use of solar power to directly heat reaction mass, and therefore does not require an electrical generator as most other forms of solar-powered propulsion do. A solar thermal rocket only has to carry the means of capturing solar energy, such as concentrators and mirrors. The heated propellant is fed through a conventional rocket nozzle to produce thrust. The engine thrust is directly related to the surface area of the solar collector and to the local intensity of the solar radiation.

In the shorter term, solar thermal propulsion has been proposed both for longer-life, lower-cost and more-flexible cryogenic upper stage launch vehicles and for orbiting propellant depots. Solar thermal propulsion is also a good candidate for use in reusable inter-orbital tugs, as it is a high-efficiency low-thrust system that can be refueled with relative ease.

== Laser thermal rocket ==
A laser thermal rocket is both a type of beam-powered propulsion and a thermal rocket. The thermal energy source is a laser, which heats a working fluid in a heat exchanger. The working fluid is then expanded through a nozzle to produce thrust. Depending on the laser power, a laser thermal rocket can have a thrust-to-weight ratio similar to chemical rockets, while achieving a specific impulse similar to nuclear thermal rockets. For ground-to-orbit launches, the laser source for such a rocket would be a permanent installation capable of high-frequency launches, while the rockets could contain inert propellant.

== Microwave thermal rocket ==
A microwave thermal rocket is similar to a laser thermal rocket, except that it is powered by a microwave source, for example a ground-based phased array. Relative to lasers, the main advantage of using microwaves is that sources currently cost 1 to 3 orders of magnitude less per Watt. The main disadvantage is that the microwave beam director needs to have a much larger diameter than a laser beam director due to beam diffraction effects.

The microwave thermal rocket was invented by Kevin L.G. Parkin in 2002 and was the subject of his Ph.D. dissertation. Between May 2012 and March 2014, the DARPA/NASA millimeter-wave thermal launch system (MTLS) project continued this work, culminating in the first microwave thermal rocket launch in February 2014. Several launches were attempted but problems with the beam director could not be resolved before funding ran out in March 2014.
