= Demonstration Rocket for Agile Cislunar Operations =

U.S. Space Nuclear Thermal Propulsion

DRACO
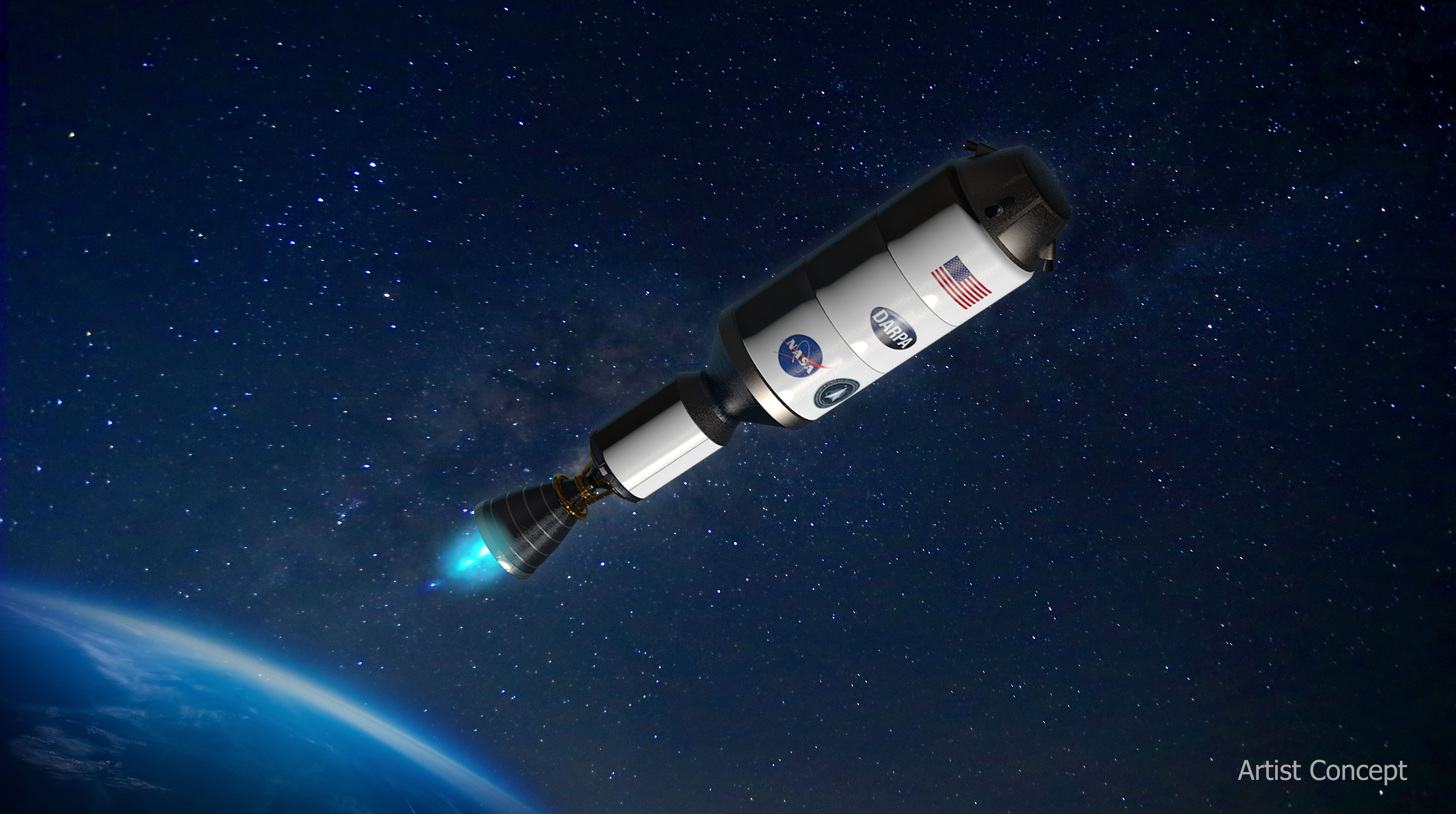
- Representation of the rocket
- Function: Spacecraft
- Manufacturer: Lockheed Martin
- Country of origin: United States
- Project cost: $499 million (Phases 2 and 3)

Launch history
- Status: Cancelled
Payloads
Payload to low Earth orbit
Payload to Moon
Payload to Venus
Payload to Mars
Stages information
First stage
Second stage

The Demonstration Rocket for Agile Cislunar Operations (DRACO) was a planned spaceflight demonstration mission under the joint auspices of DARPA, NASA, Lockheed Martin, and BWX Technologies, aiming to carry out the first in-orbit test of a nuclear thermal rocket by 2027. Fueled by low-enriched uranium, its reusability and performance were projected to significantly outpace current chemical propulsion systems. Launch operations were to be supported by the U.S. Space Force, with the Vulcan Centaur rocket identified as the planned launch vehicle. In 2023, NASA formally joined the DRACO program, seeking to leverage nuclear propulsion to drastically reduce travel time to deep-space destinations such as Mars. Nuclear thermal propulsion was expected to yield two to three times the efficiency of chemical propulsion, with mission durations to Mars potentially cut in half. DARPA program manager Tabitha Dodson remarked that nuclear propulsion could form the foundation for evolving systems such as fusion-based spacecraft, enabling more ambitious human exploration missions with greater safety margins. According to Lockheed Martin and BWXT, there were considerable efficiency and time gains from the nuclear thermal propulsion. NASA believed the much higher efficiency will be two to three times more than chemical propulsion, and the nuclear thermal rocket is to cut the journey time to Mars in half.

However, by January 2025, the mission's planned 2027 launch was placed on indefinite hold due to technical and regulatory challenges such as the complex safety and testing requirements for ground-based nuclear reactor validation and the unresolved final design of the propulsion system. The program's status was further impacted by the May 2, 2025 release of the FY2026 federal budget, which proposed a $531 million cut to NASA’s Space Technology Mission Directorate. The budget documentation cited reductions in unspecified advanced space propulsion projects. Some analysts interpreted this as effectively ending nuclear propulsion research, noting similarities to NASA’s earlier cancellation of Project Prometheus.

On May 30, 2025, the finalized FY2026 President's Budget Request confirmed DRACO's cancellation, with no funding allocated to nuclear thermal or electric propulsion programs, deemed by the Trump administration as expensive, and DARPA had completed its program termination procedures, transferring the knowledge to NASA. In late June 2025, DARPA announced that the termination was based on an assessment that the costs no longer matched the benefits and that decreasing launch costs and new analysis led to its cancellation. Although the Senate Appropriations Committee has indicated a preference for maintaining current funding levels for NSF and NASA, the cancellation of DRACO is final due to DARPA's withdrawal from it.

== Background ==
In May 1946, the U.S. Air Force launched the Nuclear Energy for Propulsion of Aircraft (NEPA) project to explore the potential of nuclear energy for powering aircraft. This initiative led to a collaborative effort of the Air Force and the U.S. Atomic Energy Commission (AEC) known as the Aircraft Nuclear Propulsion (ANP) program, aimed at developing nuclear propulsion systems for aerospace vehicles. The ANP Program was canceled in March 1961 after investing $1 billion.

Using nuclear energy for space travel reportedly has also been discussed since the 1950s among industry experts. Freeman Dyson and Ted Taylor, through their involvement in Project Orion, aimed to create an early demonstration of the technology. Ultimately, the project received backing from Wernher von Braun, and reached the test flight stage of development, but the project ended early due to environmental concerns.

In 1955, the Air Force partnered with AEC to develop reactors for nuclear rockets under Project Rover. In mid-1958, NASA replaced the Air Force and built Kiwi reactors to test nuclear rocket principles in a non-flying nuclear engine. With the next phase's Nuclear Engine for Rocket Vehicle Application (NERVA), NASA and AEC sought to develop a nuclear thermal rocket for "both long-range missions to Mars and as a possible upper-stage for the Apollo Program." Due to funding issues, NERVA ended in 1973 without a flight test.

== New program ==
In 2020, the National Academies of Sciences, Engineering, and Medicine, at the request of NASA, convened an ad hoc Space Nuclear Propulsion Technologies Committee to identify primary technical and programmatic challenges and risks for the development of space nuclear propulsion technologies for use in future exploration of the Solar System. With regard to nuclear thermal propulsion (NTP) systems, the committee identified the following technological challenges.

- A high operating power density and temperature of the reactor are necessary to heat the propellant to approximately 2700 K at the reactor exit for the duration of each burn.
- The need for long-term storage and management of cryogenic, liquid hydrogen (LH2) propellant.
- Short reactor startup times (as little as 60 s from zero to full power) relative to other space or terrestrial power reactors.
- Dealing with the long startup and shutdown transients of an NTP system relative to chemical engines. This drives design of the engine turbopumps and thermal management of the reactor subsystem.

The committee also emphasized the lack of adequate ground-based test facilities, noting that "There are currently no facilities in the United States that could conduct a full-power ground test of a full-scale NTP reactor comparable to the Rover/NERVA experiments." Nevertheless, the committee's report concluded "An aggressive program could develop an NTP system capable of executing the baseline mission [a crewed mission to Mars during opposition] in 2039."

In April 2021, DARPA announced the start of DRACO by awarding 18-month Phase 1 contracts to General Atomics for the nuclear reactor concept design ($22 million), and to Blue Origin ($2.5 million) and Lockheed Martin ($2.9 million) for their competing operation system and demonstration system concept designs.

In January 2023, NASA and DARPA announced their collaboration on DRACO, dividing the $499 million program between them for Phases 2 and 3. NASA is to be responsible for the propulsion system and nuclear reactor, and DARPA is to lead the vehicle and integration requirements, mission concept of operations, nuclear regulatory approvals and launch authority. The U.S. Space Force plans to launch DRACO on either a SpaceX Falcon 9 or a United Launch Alliance Vulcan Centaur.

On July 26, 2023, DARPA and NASA announced the awarding of a contract to Lockheed Martin and BWX Advanced Technologies (BWXT) for DRACO Phases 2 and 3 to design, build and demonstrate the experimental NTR for the 2027 launch. BWXT is slated to design and build the reactor, manufacture the fuel and deliver the complete subsystem for integration into the DRACO vehicle.

== Design ==
The main design features of DRACO include the following:

- The nuclear thermal propulsion (NTP) engine will consist of a fission reactor that transfers heat to a liquid propellant, in this case, liquid hydrogen. That heat will convert the hydrogen into a gas that expands through a nozzle to provide thrust.
- The nuclear fuel will consist of enriched uranium, that is, ^{238}U (the most commonly-occurring isotope) together with roughly 20% of ^{235}U, the fissile isotope. This level of enrichment is somewhat higher than the 3-5% common in light water power reactors on Earth, but lower than the roughly 90% enrichment characteristic of weapons-grade material. The choice of 20% enrichment was made in order to alleviate programmatic and regulatory overhead.

According to a 2019 presidential memorandum, approval for the launch of a spacecraft using uranium having enrichment below 20% (a so-called “Tier 2” vehicle) is required only by the head of the sponsoring agency (in this case, the Secretary of Defense) rather than the White House.

- The propellant will consist of liquid hydrogen (LH2) stored in a cryogenic tank. The hydrogen will be heated by the reactor in less than a second from a temperature of about 20K (-420F) to around 2,700 K. For comparison, typical water temperatures of a modern pressurized water reactor are around 600 K.
- The reactor will be integrated with an expander cycle rocket engine. In this design, a turbopump directs high-pressure liquid hydrogen down two paths. The first cools the engine’s nozzle and pressure vessel. Liquid hydrogen in the second path first cools the core support assemblies, then drives the turbopump assembly, the exhaust from which is routed back to the reactor pressure vessel where it absorbs energy from the fission reaction. The superheated gas is then expanded out through the nozzle to provide thrust.
- While details of the design thrust level have not been released, the design goal is said to be a specific impulse in excess of 800 seconds. (This is the length of time that the rocket can accelerate its own initial mass at a constant 1 gravity.) This would represent an increase of about 350 seconds compared with the specific impulse of the RL10, a liquid-fuel cryogenic rocket engine built in the United States by Aerojet Rocketdyne and which is used for Centaur upper stage of the Atlas V.
- Currently it is uncertain how difficult it might be to maintain the hydrogen propellant in a liquid state for long periods of time, as would be required for trips to Mars. In-space liquid cryogenic propellant transfer has not yet been demonstrated, but Lockheed Martin is developing a refueling vehicle to support Blue Origin’s Blue Moon lunar lander, and discussions are said to be ongoing about the possibility of installing a refueling port on DRACO.

== Development and testing ==
Phase 2 of the DRACO program will involve a test of the NTR engine without nuclear fuel, while Phase 3 will include assembly of the fueled NTR with the stage, environmental testing, and space launch to conduct experiments on the NTR and its reactor. The U.S. Department of Energy will provide HALEU metal to BWX Technologies for processing into low-enriched fuel. The amount of HALEU utilized for the vehicle has sparked some safety concerns among industry experts and the science community.

In Phase 2, the engine will be evaluated in a cold-flow test with a nonnuclear engine mock-up to assess the mechanical integrity of the core. Such tests were conducted during the Rover/NERVA program in order to study ways to prevent the core from being destroyed from the pressure and high mass flow rates due to the engine’s turbomachinery.

Phase 3 will address launch and space environments testing, assembly integration and testing of the host platform, loads testing, and learning how to interface and command the engine before it is sent to space. During the Phase 3 demonstration, the spacecraft will be launched into a high orbit around Earth, between 435 and 1,240 miles (700 to 2,000 kilometers) above the surface. Once in space, DRACO's reactor is not planned to be activated until it is established in a safe orbit. The minimum orbital altitude is determined by the estimated time it would take for the fission products to decay to the radioactivity level present at launch. In the case of the DRACO reactor, that is about 300 years, which requires an orbit above about 700 km if the orbital decay time is to exceed that value.

According to a timeline in NASA's FY 2025 Budget Estimate document presented to Congress, the project aimed to begin the implementation phase in September 2024. However, that date has passed, and more recently, it was reported that Lockheed Martin Corp. will demonstrate its technology "as early as 2027", but that launch date has since been put on hold by nuclear reactor test requirements.

== Program termination ==
DARPA did not include funding for nuclear thermal or electric propulsion programs in its FY2026 budget, whose cuts are being implemented within NASA itself in accordance to the White House goals. DARPA canceled its five-year-old DRACO project, citing a declining return on investment. According to DARPA Deputy Director Rob McHenry, the original rationale for DRACO—high launch costs and the projected efficiency of nuclear thermal engines—has been undermined by significant reductions in launch expenses driven by SpaceX and the potential of Starship. As these launch costs dropped, the benefits of nuclear thermal propulsion no longer justified its high research and development costs.

In 2026, the proposed Space Reactor‑1 Freedom was seen as the spiritual successor to the project.
