= Waldo Stakes =

American general contractor and designer of high speed vehicles

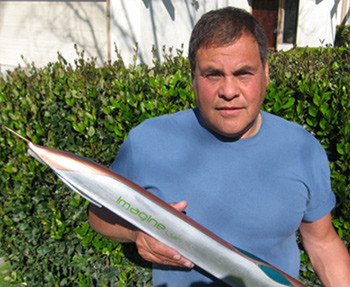
- Waldo Stakes
- Born: 23 November 1955 (age 69); Chicago, Illinois, United States
- Occupation(s): General contractor, builder of rocket vehicles

Waldo Stakes (born 23 November 1955) is an American general contractor and designer of high speed vehicles. Stakes is planning to break the world land speed record using a rocket car powered by a second-hand X-15 rocket engine, which he has named the Sonic Wind Land Speed Research Vehicle.

Stakes was a founder and one-time curator of the Saxon Aerospace Museum in Boron, California.

Stakes was a collaborator with "Mad" Mike Hughes in his attempts to achieve suborbital flight using a steam-driven rocket.
