= Fission-fragment rocket =

Type of nuclear propulsion method with an ultra high specific-inpulse

The fission-fragment rocket is a rocket engine design that directly harnesses hot nuclear fission products for thrust, as opposed to using a separate fluid as working mass. The design can, in theory, produce very high specific impulse while still being well within the abilities of current technologies.

== Design considerations ==
In traditional nuclear thermal rocket and related designs, the nuclear energy is generated in some form of reactor and used to heat a working fluid to generate thrust. This limits the designs to temperatures that allow the reactor to remain whole, although clever design can increase this critical temperature into the tens of thousands of degrees. A rocket engine's efficiency is strongly related to the temperature of the exhausted working fluid, and in the case of the most advanced gas-core engines, it corresponds to a specific impulse of about 7000 s.

The temperature of a conventional reactor design is the average temperature of the fuel, the vast majority of which is not reacting at any given instant. The atoms undergoing fission are at a temperature of millions of degrees, which is then spread out into the surrounding fuel, resulting in an overall temperature of a few thousand.

By physically arranging the fuel into very thin layers or particles, the fragments of a nuclear reaction can escape from the surface. Since they will be ionized due to the high energy of the reaction, they can then be handled magnetically and channeled to produce thrust. Numerous technological challenges still remain, however.

== Research ==
=== Rotating fuel reactor ===
Fission-fragment propulsion concept: 1. fissionable filaments arranged in disks; 2. revolving shaft; 3. reactor core; 4. fragments exhaust

A design by the Idaho National Engineering Laboratory and Lawrence Livermore National Laboratory uses fuel placed on the surface of a number of very thin carbon fibres, arranged radially in wheels. The wheels are normally sub-critical. Several such wheels were stacked on a common shaft to produce a single large cylinder. The entire cylinder was rotated so that some fibres were always in a reactor core where surrounding moderator made fibres go critical. The fission fragments at the surface of the fibres would break free and be channeled for thrust. The fibre then rotates out of the reaction zone to cool, avoiding melting.

The efficiency of the system is surprising; specific impulses of greater than 100,000 s are possible using existing materials. This is high performance, although the weight of the reactor core and other elements would make the overall performance of the fission-fragment system lower. Nonetheless, the system provides the sort of performance levels that would make an interstellar precursor mission possible.

=== Dusty plasma ===
Dusty plasma bed reactor: A. fission fragments ejected for propulsion; B. reactor; C. fission fragments decelerated for power generation; d. moderator (BeO or LiH); e. containment field generator; f. RF induction coil

A newer design proposal by Rodney L. Clark and Robert B. Sheldon theoretically increases efficiency and decreases complexity of a fission fragment rocket at the same time over the rotating fibre wheel proposal. Their design uses nanoparticles of fissionable fuel (or even fuel that will naturally radioactively decay) of less than 100 nm diameter. The nanoparticles are kept in a vacuum chamber subject to an axial magnetic field (acting as a magnetic mirror) and an external electric field. As the nanoparticles ionize as fission occurs, the dust becomes suspended within the chamber. The incredibly high surface area of the particles makes radiative cooling simple. The axial magnetic field is too weak to affect the motions of the dust particles but strong enough to channel the fragments into a beam which can be decelerated for power, allowed to be emitted for thrust, or a combination of the two.

With exhaust velocities of 3% - 5% the speed of light and efficiencies up to 90%, the rocket should be able to achieve an I_{sp} of over 1,000,000 seconds. By further injecting the fission fragment exhaust with a neutral gas akin to an afterburner setup, the resulting heating and interaction can result in a higher, tunable thrust and specific impulse. For realistic designs, some calculations estimate thrusts on the range of 4.5 kN at around 32,000 seconds I_{sp}, or even 40 kN at 5,000 seconds I_{sp}.

=== Am-242m as nuclear fuel ===
In 1987, Ronen & Leibson published a study on applications of ^{242m}Am (an isotope of americium) as nuclear fuel to space nuclear reactors, noting its extremely high thermal cross section and energy density. Nuclear systems powered by ^{242m}Am require less fuel by a factor of 2 to 100 compared to conventional nuclear fuels.

Fission-fragment rocket using ^{242m}Am was proposed by George Chapline at Lawrence Livermore National Laboratory in 1988, who suggested propulsion based on the direct heating of a propellant gas by fission fragments generated by a fissile material. Ronen et al. demonstrate that ^{242m}Am can maintain sustained nuclear fission as an extremely thin metallic film, less than a micrometer thick. ^{242m}Am requires only 1% of the mass of ^{235}U or ^{239}Pu to reach its critical state. Ronen's group at Ben-Gurion University of the Negev further showed that nuclear fuel based on ^{242m}Am could speed space vehicles from Earth to Mars in as little as two weeks.

^{242m}Am's potential as a nuclear fuel comes from the fact that it has the highest thermal fission cross section (thousands of barns), about 10x the next highest cross section across all known isotopes. ^{242m}Am is fissile and has a low critical mass, comparable to ^{239}Pu. It has a very high cross section for fission, and is destroyed relatively quickly in a nuclear reactor. Another report claims that ^{242m}Am can sustain a chain reaction even as a thin film, and could be used for a novel type of nuclear rocket.

Since the thermal absorption cross section of ^{242m}Am is very high, the best way to obtain ^{242m}Am is by the capture of fast or epithermal neutrons in Americium-241 irradiated in a fast reactor. However, fast neutron reactors are not readily available. Detailed analysis of ^{242m}Am production in existing PWRs was provided in. Proliferation resistance of ^{242m}Am was reported by Karlsruhe Institute of Technology 2008 study.

In 2000, Carlo Rubbia at CERN further extended the work by Ronen and Chapline on fission-fragment rocket using ^{242m}Am as a fuel. Project 242 based on Rubbia design studied a concept of ^{242m}Am based Thin-Film Fission Fragment Heated NTR by using direct conversion of the kinetic energy of fission fragments into increasing of enthalpy of a propellant gas. Project 242 studied the application of this propulsion system to a crewed mission to Mars. Preliminary results were very satisfactory and it has been observed that a propulsion system with these characteristics could make the mission feasible. Another study focused on production of ^{242m}Am in conventional thermal nuclear reactors.

=== Aerogel core ===
On 9 January 2023, NASA announced funding the study of an "Aerogel Core Fission Fragment Rocket Engine", where fissile fuel particles will be embedded in an ultra-low density aerogel matrix to achieve a critical mass assembly. The aerogel matrix (and a strong magnetic field) would allow fission fragments to escape the core, while increasing conductive and radiative heat loss from the individual fuel particles.

== See also ==
- Fission sail
- Nuclear salt-water rocket
- Pulsed nuclear thermal rocket
- Fission fragment reactor
