= George Chapline Jr. =

American theoretical physicist

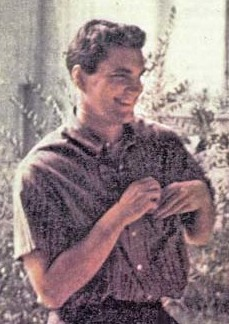
- Chapline, 1963
- Born: May 6, 1942 (age 84); Teaneck, New Jersey, U.S.
- Education: Caltech; UCLA
- Known for: Type I supergravity; Quantum mechanics
- Awards: E. O. Lawrence Award, 1982
- Scientific career
- Fields: Theoretical Physics
- Workplaces: Lawrence Livermore National Laboratory

George Frederick Chapline Jr. (born May 6, 1942) is an American theoretical physicist, based at the Lawrence Livermore National Laboratory. His most recent interests have mainly been in quantum information theory, condensed matter, and quantum gravity. In 2003 he received the Computing Anticipatory Systems award for a new interpretation of quantum mechanics based on the similarity of quantum mechanics and Helmholtz machines. He was awarded the E. O. Lawrence Award in 1982 by the United States Department of Energy for leading the team that first demonstrated a working X-ray laser.

== Work ==
In the field of condensed matter physics Chapline is best known as the originator of the concept of a gossamer metal; i.e. a metal where the density of states at the Fermi surface is depressed because of pairing correlations. Both the actinides and high T_{c} superconductors are examples of gossamer metals.

Chapline is known for his work with Nick S. Manton on finding the classical equations which unify supergravity and Yang–Mills gauge theories in type I supergravity. These equations play an important role in superstring theory. Chapline was also the first person to point out that the anomaly cancellation condition for superstrings in 10 dimensions could be satisfied by E8 x E8, and the first person to suggest that the 24-dimensional Leech lattice might play a central role in a theory unifying gravity and elementary particle physics.

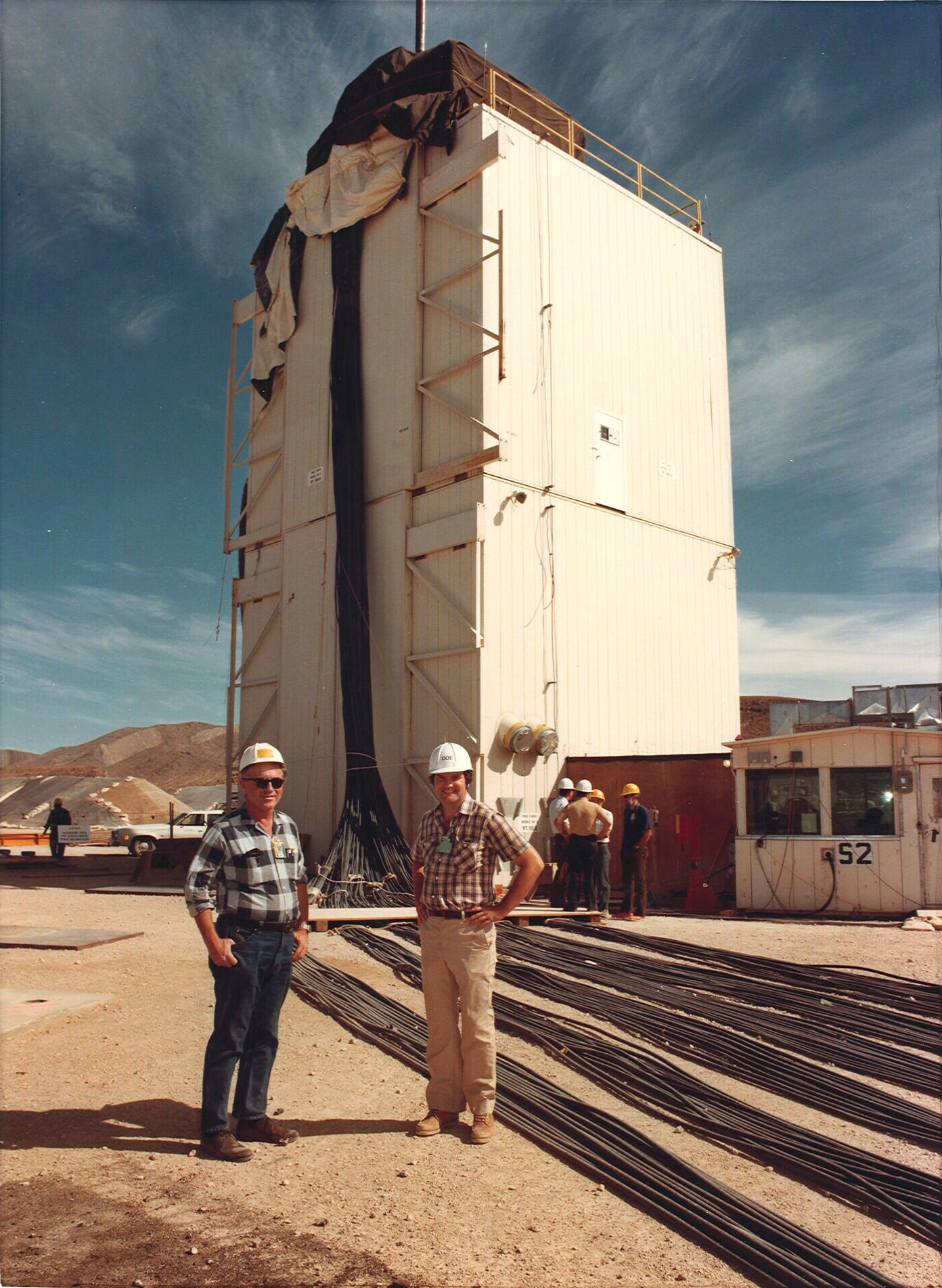
Chapline (right) and the world's first X-ray laser

Chapline is perhaps best known for his research on black holes, proposing that they cannot be described as solutions of Einstein’s general relativity equations. Drawing upon quantum mechanical insights of himself and Pawel Mazur from the early 2000s, he proposed that objects currently thought to be black holes are actually dark-energy stars. Chapline and Mazur are also responsible for the only known exact result in quantum gravity; namely all rotating space-times can be constructed from an array of quantized spinning strings.

This idea incorporates the 1980 proposal by Robert B. Laughlin and Chapline that the surface of a black hole actually represents a quantum critical transition of a superfluid vacuum. The Chapline–Laughlin theory predicts that space-times with a large vacuum energy are unstable to the formation of dark energy stars; in the context of the early universe, this provides a natural explanation for both dark matter and the metric fluctuations which led to the formation of galaxies. A remarkable astrophysical prediction of the Chapline–Laughlin theory is that dark energy stars should be prolific sources of positrons because nucleons decay when they encounter the surface of a dark energy star. A remarkable prediction of this new theory of black hole surfaces is that the mass spectrum of primordial black holes should have a low mass cutfoff near 0.1 solar masses, which ought to be observable with the Roman space telescope operating together with large ground based telescopes.

Chapline's interest in quantum gravity dates from the time when as a teenager he wrote Richard Feynman a letter about the problem of quantum propagation in a gravitational field. Because quantum mechanics is intrinsically non-local while the equivalence principle is local there is a tension between quantum mechanics and general relativity that has not yet been resolved. As a result of his letter Feynman invited the 15-year-old Chapline to have lunch at Caltech. Chapline and Feynman talked often about physics in the following years, particularly when he was a graduate student at Caltech (see photo). Feynman reportedly helped Chapline get his first job, as an assistant professor at UC Santa Cruz.

Chapline is also well known for his work on quantum mechanics and Bayesian inference. The ideas which led to his Computing Anticipatory award from the U Liege in 2004 are described in his book “Quantum Mechanics and Bayesian Machines” published by World Scientific in 2023.

Chapline earned a B.A. in mathematics at UCLA in 1961. He was a member of the 1959 UCLA Putnam Competition team which scored 3rd in the nation. He earned a PhD in physics from Caltech in 1967.

== See also ==
- Robert B. Laughlin
- Dark energy
- Superconductor
- Fission-fragment rocket

== Sources ==
- George Frederick Chapline Jr., Marquis Who's Who TM. Marquis Who's Who, 2009. Reproduced in Biography Resource Center. Farmington Hills, Michigan: Gale, 2009 Document Number: K2016377061 (fee required); accessed 2009-10-22 via Fairfax County Public Library.
