= Nuclear salt-water rocket =

Proposed rocket propulsion mechanism

The nuclear salt-water rocket (NSWR) is a theoretical type of nuclear thermal rocket designed by Robert Zubrin. In place of traditional chemical propellant, such as that in a chemical rocket, the rocket would be fueled by salts of plutonium or 20%-enriched uranium. The solution would be contained in a bundle of pipes coated in boron carbide (for its properties of neutron absorption). Through a combination of the coating and space between the pipes, the contents would not reach critical mass until the solution is pumped into a reaction chamber, thus reaching a critical mass, and being expelled through a nozzle to generate thrust.

== Proposed design ==
Chemical rockets use heat energy produced by a chemical reaction to heat the gas products. The hot products exit through a propulsion nozzle at a very high speed, creating thrust. In a nuclear thermal rocket (NTR), thrust is created by heating a fluid by using a nuclear fission reactor. The lower the molecular weight of the exhaust (hydrogen having the lowest possible), the more efficient the motor can be. However, in this engine the propellant can be any of many fluids having suitable properties as it does not participate in generating heat. In a NSWR, the nuclear salt-water would be made to flow through a reaction chamber and out of an exhaust nozzle in such a way and at such speeds that critical mass will begin once the chamber is filled to a certain point; however, the peak neutron flux of the fission reaction would occur outside the vehicle.

== Advantages ==
There are several advantages relative to conventional NTR designs. As the peak neutron flux and fission reaction rates would occur outside the vehicle, these activities could be much more vigorous than they could be if it was necessary to house them in a vessel (which would have temperature limits due to materials constraints). Additionally, a contained reactor can allow only a small percentage of its fuel to undergo fission at any given time; otherwise, it would overheat and melt down (or explode in a runaway fission chain reaction). The fission reaction in an NSWR is dynamic, and because the reaction products are exhausted into space, it does not have a limit on the proportion of fission fuel that reacts. In many ways, NSWRs combine the advantages of fission reactors and fission bombs.

Because they can harness the power of what is essentially a continuous nuclear fission explosion, NSWRs would have both very high thrust and very high exhaust velocity, meaning that the rocket would accelerate quickly and be extremely efficient in terms of propellant usage. The combination of high thrust and high specific impulse (ISP) is a rare trait in the rocket world. One design would generate 13 meganewtons of thrust at 66 km/s exhaust velocity (6,730 seconds ISP), compared to about 4.5 km/s (450 seconds ISP) exhaust velocity for the best chemical rockets as of February 2023.

The design and calculations discussed above are using 20%-enriched uranium salts. However, it would be plausible to use another design which could achieve much higher exhaust velocities (4,725 km/s) and use a 30,000-tonne ice comet along with 7,500 tonnes of highly enriched uranium salts to propel a 300-tonne spacecraft up to 7.62% of the speed of light and potentially arrive at Alpha Centauri after a 60-year journey.

"NSWRs share many of the features of Orion propulsion systems, except that NSWRs would generate continuous rather than pulsed thrust and may be workable on much smaller scales than the smallest feasible Orion designs (which are generally large, due to the requirements of the shock-absorber system and the minimum size of efficient nuclear explosives)."

== Limitations ==
The propellant used in the initial design would contain a rather large amount of the relatively expensive isotope ^{235}U, which would not be very cost effective. However, if the use of NSWR began to rise, it would be possible to replace this with the cheaper isotopes ^{233}U or ^{239}Pu in either fission breeder reactors or (much better) nuclear fusion–fission hybrid reactors. These other fissiles would have the right characteristics to serve nearly as well, at a relatively low cost.

Another major limitation of the Zubrin's nuclear salt-water rocket design included the lack of a material to be used in the reaction chamber that could actually sustain such a reaction within a spacecraft. Zubrin claimed in his design that the apparatus was created so that the liquid flow rate or velocity was what mattered most in the process, not the material. Therefore, he argued that if the proper velocity was chosen for the liquid traveling through the reaction chamber, the site of maximum fission release could then be located at the end of the chamber, thus allowing the system to remain intact and safe to operate. These claims are unproven due to no such device having ever been built or tested.

For example, Zubrin argues that if diluted nuclear fuel flows into the chamber at speed similar to diffusion speed of thermal neutrons, then the nuclear reaction is confined in the chamber and does not damage the rest of the system (the nuclear analog of a gas burner). A possible problem in that line of thinking is that neutrons do not all diffuse at the same velocity, but have a broad distribution over several orders of magnitude. It is possible that tails of this velocity distribution would be sufficient to generate enough heat in fuel feeding system (by scattering and fission) to destroy the system. This question can be perhaps answered by detailed Monte Carlo simulations of neutron transport.

The vessel's exhaust would contain radioactive isotopes, but in space, these would be rapidly dispersed after travelling only a short distance; the exhaust would also be travelling at high speed (in Zubrin's scenario, faster than Solar escape velocity, allowing it to eventually leave the Solar System). However, this is of little use on the surface of a planet, where a NSWR would eject massive quantities of superheated steam, still containing fissioning nuclear salts. Terrestrial testing might be subject to reasonable objections; as physicist John G. Cramer wrote, "Writing the environmental impact statement for such tests [...] might present an interesting problem".

It is also not certain that fission in a NSWR could be controlled:

Whether fast criticality can be controlled in a rocket engine remains an open question.

— Ralph L. McNutt Jr.

== See also ==
- Fission-fragment rocket
- Project Orion
- Spacecraft propulsion
- Technology readiness level
