= Westinghouse Advanced Energy Systems Division =

US research facility

- Type: Division
- Industry: Aerospace
- Founded: July 26, 1959; 67 years ago
- Headquarters: Large, Pennsylvania, United States
- Key people: John W. Simpson; Sidney Krasik; Frank Cotter (technical director)
- Parent: Westinghouse Electric Corporation

Westinghouse Advanced Energy Systems Division (AESD) was a research and development facility for nonconventional renewable energy systems, in the small town of Large in Allegheny County, Pennsylvania [USA]. The site is on the east side of Pa. Rte. 51, about 13 miles (21 km) south of Pittsburgh. Formerly the site of the Westinghouse Astronuclear Laboratory (WANL), Westinghouse Electric Corporation changed the name of the facility, along with its charter, in 1977.

== Founding ==
The laboratory was officially founded as a Westinghouse division on July 26, 1959, with six employees and at first operated out of offices in the Pittsburgh suburb of Whitehall. Naval Academy graduate John W. Simpson headed the team with Cornell University physicist Sidney Krasik and Technical Director Frank Cotter as founding members.

== WANL's brief but important life cycle ==
WANL's origins can be traced to 1959 when a dozen engineers and technical specialists from Bettis set up a lab in nearby Whitehall, Pa., for the purpose of bidding on government research and development contracts. In 1960, the operation moved to a new site in Mt. Lebanon, Pa., and continued efforts to land a major development contract.

In 1961, NASA's Space Nuclear Propulsion Office's project NERVA, in conjunction with the Atomic Energy Commission, jointly awarded Aerojet General Corporation the prime contract for its Nuclear Engine for Rocket Vehicle Application NERVA Program, with a significant subcontract to WANL for development of the reactor itself. With the award, WANL selected the Large site as the base for operations and moved its personnel to the facility. Originally authorized in May 1959, WANL officially became a Westinghouse division on July 26, 1959, under the leadership of John Wistar Simpson. Cornell University physicist Sidney Krasik served as the first technical director and Frank Cotter was the first marketing director. Born in 1914, Simpson graduated from the United States Naval Academy in 1937 and earned an MS from the University of Pittsburgh in 1941. Working in the switchgear division of Westinghouse's East Pittsburgh plant, Simpson helped develop the electric switchboards that could survive the extreme impacts experienced by naval vessels in the Pacific Theater during World War II. In 1946, he took a leave of absence to work at Oak Ridge National Laboratory to familiarize himself with atomic power. Upon his return, he became assistant manager in the engineering department of the Westinghouse Bettis Atomic Power Laboratory. He subsequently managed the construction of the Shippingport Atomic Power Station in 1954, the first commercial nuclear power plant in the United States. Promoted the next year to general manager of the Bettis Laboratory, he was elected a Westinghouse vice president in 1958 and by 1959 was eager to take on the new challenge of developing nuclear rocket engines to enable the exploration of the Solar System.

Under the NERVA contract, the initial objective was to build a rocket engine that could deliver at least 825 seconds of specific impulse, at least 50,000 pounds of thrust, at least 10 minutes of continuous operation at full thrust, and have the ability to start up on its own with no external energy source. Liquid hydrogen served as the propellant that was supplied to the reactor core by turbopumps and also provided regenerative cooling. The cylindrical graphite core was surrounded by twelve rotating control drums with beryllium on one side to reflect neutrons and boral on the other side to absorb neutrons to control the rate of the nuclear reaction in the core. The core consisted of clusters of hexagonal graphite fuel elements containing pyrographite-coated beads of uranium pellets coated with niobium carbide to prevent corrosion by exposure to the hydrogen propellant. Each fuel rod cluster was supported by an inconel tie rod. The fuel pellets were provided by Westinghouse Astrofuel's Cheswick plant in Allegheny County. Fuel element corrosion tests were first conducted at Cheswick, and later at the Westinghouse Waltz Mill facility in Westmoreland County.

The first proof of concept test of an assembled Westinghouse-Aerojet rocket engine (NRX-A2) was conducted at Jackass Flats, Nevada on September 24, 1964, that provided six minutes of continuous operation. By April 23, 1965, the NRX-A3 provided sixteen minutes of operation and a three-minute restart and incorporated pulse cooling for the first time. In 1966 the NRX-A5/EST delivered two separate periods of full power totaling 30 minutes. In December 1967 the NRX-A6 delivered sixty minutes of operation at full power and on June 11, 1969, the XE engine was started twenty times for a total of three hours and forty-eight minutes, eleven of which were at full power. By 1970, the proposed NERVA I concept vehicle that evolved out of this work was projected to be capable of delivering 1500 MW of power and 75,000 pounds of thrust. It also had a projected lifetime runtime of ten hours and could be started and stopped up to 60 times while delivering a specific impulse of 850 seconds. Its total weight was less than 15,000 pounds. Westinghouse and Aerojet were ready to begin construction of the first flight engines to be launched from the Kennedy Space Center in Florida beginning in 1973 when the program was canceled. The total amount spent on the project up to that time was $1.45 billion and more than 1,100 people were employed by the project. A NASA plan released in 1969 to land the first humans on Mars by 1981 using the NERVA engines was also quietly shelved at that time. Government funding for the NERVA program was ended in 1972 due to "lack of clear requirements for its capabilities." However, work on the project helped achieve major milestones in developing high-temperature/high-strength materials technology, which finds application in aerospace and a myriad of private-sector industries.

While other innovative projects (such as development of a fully implantable, self-contained, nuclear-powered artificial heart) were pursued into the mid-1970s, WANL ceased operations as a formal Westinghouse division shortly thereafter.

== Advanced Energy Systems Division ==
In 1976, the Company changed the name of the site to the Westinghouse Advanced Energy Systems Division (AESD), making it an R&D site for development of nonconventional renewable energy systems. According to the official announcement, AESD's mission would be "Engineering today's science into tomorrow's power systems." Under the leadership of Max Johnson, General Manager, AESD engineers designed and built prototype devices such as a heliostat, which was designed to concentrate sunlight (by means of a tracking, flat-mirror assembly) onto a fluid-filled tank mounted on a tower. This hot fluid could then be transferred to the ground and used to produce steam, spinning a turbine to generate electricity. [The Division's heliostat design resulted from a DoE sponsored competition in the late 1970s for the best design for use in the proposed "Solar One" power tower project near Barstow, California. A prototype was built at the Large site and shipped to the Mojave Desert for testing, but another design ultimately was selected.]

Among AESD's successes was the winning site and conceptual design proposal for the Solar Total Energy Project (STEP) in Shenandoah [now part of Newnan], Coweta County, Georgia, 35 miles (56 km) south of Atlanta along I-85. Financed as a joint project by Georgia Power Company (part of Southern Company) and the U.S. Department of Energy, STEP operated from 1982 until 1989. Covering more than 5 acres (20,000 m^{2}), it was the world's largest solar thermal cogeneration project. It consisted of 114 tracking parabolic-dish collectors (7 m dia), which heated a transfer fluid that produced high-pressure steam for generating electricity that was fed to an adjacent knitwear factory owned and operated by Bleyle of Germany. Downstream of the turbine, medium-pressure steam was piped to the plant for knitwear pressing, and low-pressure steam was used to provide air conditioning. The project was dismantled in 1989 when the turbine failed and there were no funds to replace it or provide other needed maintenance on the facility.

Other work conducted at AESD included testing of nickel metal hydride battery prototypes. A phosphoric acid fuel cell was designed, built, and tested successfully. Dendritic web silicon photocells were built and tested, and that business was later sold and transferred to Solar Power Industries Inc. of West Newton, Pa. AESD engineers also built a prototype for a magnetohydrodynamic (MHD) system utilizing hot plasma gases emitted by a coal-fired power plant. The exhaust gasses passed through a copper plate channel, generating additional electricity [up to 30%].

== Advanced Power Systems Divisions ==
During the time that AESD was active, the Large site also housed the Westinghouse Fusion Power Systems Department (FPSD), which had a role in development and startup of the Tokamak Reactor at the Princeton Plasma Physics Laboratory (PPPL) in 1982. Along with the Advanced Coal Conversion Department (ACCD) and Advanced Reactors Division (ARD), AESD and FPSD constituted the company's Advanced Power Systems Business Unit (APSBU), which was based at the company's Waltz Mill Site in Madison, Pennsylvania, along I-70 a few miles west of the New Stanton interchange of the Pennsylvania Turnpike (I-76).

ACCD operated a coal gasification process demonstration unit (PDU), which was funded by DoE in the early 1970s, and conducted related research projects. ARD had the development contract for the planned Liquid Metal Fast Breeder Reactor (LMFBR) project at Clinch River, Tennessee, near the Oak Ridge National Laboratory.

The PDU gasifier was eventually sold to Kellogg-Rust, which operated it as Kellogg-Rust-Westinghouse and later KRW Energy Systems. Funding for the LMFBR project was discontinued in 1983, and ARD was merged into AESD at the Large site under Dr. W. Howard Arnold. At the same time, a new Waste Technology Services Division (WTSD), under Leo P. Duffy, was formed to address nuclear waste handling and disposal issues. Both Arnold and Duffy had decades of nuclear-related experience with Westinghouse at Bettis, WANL, and government labs.

== 1980s and beyond ==
John Yasinsky, general manager of ACCD in the late 1970s, became general manager of the Advanced Power Systems Divisions in the early 1980s and was named CEO of Westinghouse Electric Corporation in the early 1990s. By 1995, Yasinsky had moved on to become chairman and CEO of GenCorp Inc., and Westinghouse acquired and merged with Columbia Broadcasting System (CBS), took the name CBS, and began selling off all nonbroadcast operations. This marked the end of the heritage Westinghouse Electric Corporation, although the name "Westinghouse" endures in various forms for companies in business sectors as diverse as commercial nuclear power, light bulbs, and large and small appliances.

The former WANL/AESD/FPSD Large site closed for good in the early 1990s, and space was leased to a range of commercial tenants. In 1994, a group of former employees at the site formed Pittsburgh Materials Technology Inc. (PMTI) to build upon the capabilities developed by Westinghouse, including advanced refractory metal alloys. As of 2007, PMTI was still melting, processing and testing alloys such as niobium-base, tantalum-base, and vanadium-base compositions for a range of customers, particularly in the aerospace sector.

In May 2010, PMTI was acquired by Lancaster, Pennsylvania-based Thermacore Inc.

== Post-Westinghouse site activities ==
With the decline of the nuclear power industry subsequent to the Three Mile Island accident and the Chernobyl disaster, Westinghouse abandoned the Large facility by the early 1990s, and space was leased to a range of commercial tenants. In 1994, a group of former employees at the site formed Pittsburgh Materials Technology Inc. (PMTI) to build upon the capabilities developed by Westinghouse, including advanced refractory metal alloys. In 2007, PMTI is still melting, processing and testing alloys such as niobium-base, tantalum-base, and vanadium-base compositions for a range of customers in both the aerospace and industrial sectors.
