= Saturn C-5N =

Proposed NASA super heavy-lift launcher

- Country of origin: United States

Size
- Height: 98 m (320 ft)
- Diameter: 10 m (33 ft)
- Mass: 2,841,040 kg (6,263,420 lb)
- Stages: 3

Capacity

Payload to LEO
- Altitude: 115 mi (185 km)
- Mass: 155,000 kilograms (342,000 lb)

Payload to TLI
- Mass: 64,000 kg (141,000 lb)

Associated rockets
- Family: Saturn

Launch history
- Status: Concept
- Partial failure

First stage – S-IC C-5A
- Height: 42.87 m (140.64 ft)
- Diameter: 10 m (33 ft)
- Empty mass: 131,495 kg (289,896 lb)
- Gross mass: 2,217,285 kg (4,888,276 lb)
- Powered by: 5 × F-1
- Maximum thrust: 38,257.99 kN (8,600,738 lbf) vacuum
- Specific impulse: 304 s (2.98 km/s)
- Burn time: 160 seconds
- Propellant: LOX / RP-1

Second stage – S-II C-5A
- Height: 21.39 m (70.17 ft)
- Diameter: 10 m (33 ft)
- Empty mass: 31,740 kg (69,970 lb)
- Gross mass: 384,100 kg (846,700 lb)
- Powered by: 5 × J-2
- Maximum thrust: 4,446.65 kN (999,646 lbf) vacuum
- Specific impulse: 420 s (4.1 km/s)
- Burn time: 320 seconds
- Propellant: LOX / LH_{2}

Third stage – S-N C-5N
- Height: 19.29 m (63.30 ft)
- Diameter: 10.26 m (33 ft 8 in)
- Empty mass: 10,429 kg (22,992 lb)
- Gross mass: 53,694 kg (118,375 lb)
- Powered by: 1 × NERVA
- Maximum thrust: 266.80 kN (59,979 lbf) vacuum
- Specific impulse: 800 s (7.8 km/s)
- Burn time: 1250 seconds
- Propellant: Nuclear / LH_{2}

The Saturn C-5N was a conceptual successor to the Saturn V launch vehicle which would have had a nuclear thermal third stage instead of the S-IVB used on the Saturn V. This one change would have increased the payload of the standard Saturn V to Low Earth orbit from 118,000 kg to 155,000 kg.

The conceptual Saturn C-5N was designed as an evolutionary successor to the Saturn V, intended for the planned crewed mission to Mars by 1980, it would have cut crewed transit times to Mars to about 4 months, instead of the 8–9 months of chemical rocket engines. However the Mars mission, along with all work related to the evolutionary successors of the Saturn V, was cancelled in 1972-3 by the Nixon Administration.

The ground testing of the NERVA nuclear thermal rocket engines intended for the Saturn C-5N's, in-space 3rd stage, still hold a number of combined rocket thrust and specific impulse records. The concept of nuclear thermal rockets serving as the in-space rocket stage influenced the 1990s Project Timberwind.

== See also ==
- NERVA
