= Project Timberwind =

US project, 1987–1991, to develop nuclear thermal rocket engines

Project Timberwind was a project to develop nuclear thermal rockets. Initial funding by the Strategic Defense Initiative from 1987 through 1991 totaled $139 million (then-year). The proposed rocket was later expanded into a larger design after the project was transferred to the Air Force Space Nuclear Thermal Propulsion (SNTP) program.

The program underwent an audit in 1992 due to security concerns raised by Steven Aftergood. This highly classified program provided the motivation for starting the FAS Government Secrecy project. Convicted spy Stewart Nozette was found to be on the master access list for the TIMBER WIND project.

Advances in high-temperature metals, computer modelling and nuclear engineering in general resulted in dramatically improved performance. Whereas the NERVA engine was projected to weigh about 6803 kg, the final SNTP offered just over 1/3 the thrust from an engine of only 1650 kg (less than 1/4 the mass), while further improving the specific impulse from 930 to 1000 seconds.

== History ==
In 1983, the Strategic Defense Initiative ("Star Wars") identified missions that could benefit from rockets that are more powerful than chemical rockets, and some that could only be undertaken by more powerful rockets. The concept incorporated a particle/pebble-bed reactor, a concept developed by James R. Powell at the Brookhaven National Laboratory, which promised a specific impulse of up to 1,000 seconds (9.8 km/s) and a thrust to weight ratio of between 25 and 35 for thrust levels greater than 89,000 newtons (20,000 lbf).

From 1987 to 1991 it was funded as a secret project codenamed Project Timberwind, which spent $139 million. The proposed rocket project was transferred to the Space Nuclear Thermal Propulsion (SNTP) program at the Air Force Phillips Laboratory in October 1991. NASA conducted studies as part of its 1992 Space Exploration Initiative (SEI) but felt that SNTP offered insufficient improvement over NERVA, and was not required by any SEI missions. The SNTP program was terminated in January 1994, after $200 million was spent.

During this timeframe, there was an unrelated and unclassified space nuclear electric power project called SP-100. SP-100, was created in February 1983 with the aim of developing a 100 KW nuclear power system for missions that require reliable high electric power. One example of such a mission is electric propulsion for interplanetary missions.

== Timberwind Specifications ==
=== Timberwind 45 on Timberwind Centaur ===
- Diameter: 13.94 ft (4.25 m), Length: 23.87 m
- Nr of engines : 1
- Vacuum thrust: 99208 lbf (441.3 kN)
- Sea level thrust: 88305 lbf (392.8 kN)
- Vacuum specific impulse: 1000 s
- Sea level specific impulse: 890 s
- Engine mass: 3300 lb (1500 kg)
- Thrust to Weight Ratio: 30
- Burn time: 449 s
- Propellants: Nuclear/LH_{2}

=== Timberwind 75 on Timberwind Titan ===
- Stage Diameter: 6.1 m (20 ft) Length: 45.50 m
- Diameter: 5.67 ft (2.03 m)
- Nr of engines : 3
- Engine :
  - Vacuum thrust: 165347 lbf (735.5 kN)
  - Sea level thrust: 147160 lbf (654.6 kN)
  - Vacuum specific impulse: 1000 s
  - Sea level specific impulse: 890 s
  - Engine mass: 5500 lb (2500 kg)
  - Thrust to Weight Ratio: 30
- Burn time: 357 s
- Propellants: Nuclear/LH_{2}

=== Timberwind 250 stage and engine ===
- Diameter: 28.50 ft (8.70 m). Length: 30.00 m
- Nr of engines : 1
  - Vacuum thrust: 551,142 lbf (2,451.6 kN).
  - Sea level thrust: 429,902 lbf (1,912.0 kN)
  - Vacuum specific impulse: 1,000 s.
  - Sea level specific impulse: 780 s.
  - Engine mass: 8,300 kg (18,200 lb).
  - Thrust to Weight Ratio: 30
- Burn time: 493 s
- Propellants: Nuclear/LH_{2}

== Space Nuclear Thermal Propulsion Program ==
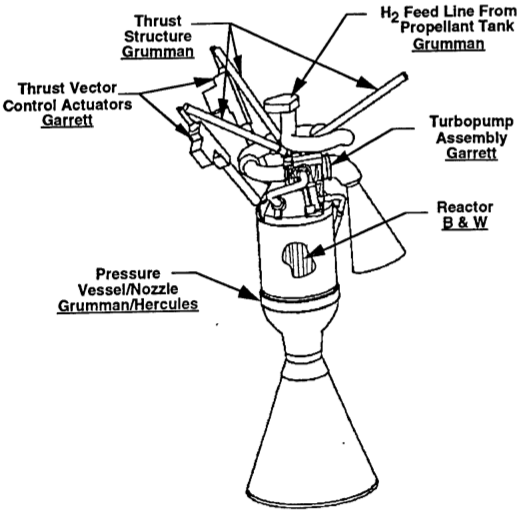
SNTP engine

Baseline fuel particle

Typical reactor assembly

Graphite turbine wheel

Integrated C-C pressure vessel and nozzle

PBR upper stage applications

PBR design methodology

In contrast to the TIMBER WIND project, the Space Nuclear Thermal Propulsion (SNTP) program was intended to develop upper-stages for space-lift which would not operate within the Earth's atmosphere. SNTP failed to achieve its objective of flight testing a nuclear thermal upper-stage, and was terminated in January 1994. The program involved coordinating efforts across the Department of Defense, the Department of Energy, and their contractors from operating sites across the United States. A major accomplishment of the program was to coordinate Environmental Protection Agency approvals for ground testing at two possible sites.

Participating or cooperating agencies
Name	Location	Responsibilities
Brookhaven National Laboratory	Upton, New York	Reactor materials and components testing; thermal-hydraulic, and neutronic analysis; reactor design studies
Babcock & Wilcox	Lynchburg, Virginia	Reactor design testing, fabrication and assembly
Sandia National Labs	Albuquerque, New Mexico	Nuclear safety, nuclear instrumentation and operation, reactor control system modeling, nuclear testing
Aerojet Propulsion Division	Sacramento, California	Fuel element alternate materials development
Hercules Aerospace Corporation	Magna, Utah	Design and fabrication of engine lower structure and nozzle
Garrett Fluid Systems Division	Tempe, Arizona and San Tan, Arizona	Design and fabrication of attitude control system, propellant flow control system and turbopump assembly
AiResearch Los Angeles Division of Allied Signal	Torrance, California	Turbine wheel testing
Grumman Space Electronics Division	Bethpage, New York	Vehicle design and fabrication, systems integration
Raytheon Services Nevada	Las Vegas, Nevada	Facility and Coolant Supply System (CSS) engineering, facility construction management
Reynolds Electrical and Engineering Company	Las Vegas, Nevada	Facility construction
Fluor-Daniel	Irvine, California	Effluent Treatment System (ETS) engineering
Sandia National Labs	Saddle Mountain Test Site or QUEST or LOFT sites	Test site preparation, planning and performance of engine ground tests, nuclear component testing
[Redacted]	Washington, DC	Program management
United States Department of Energy Headquarters	Washington, DC	Program management, nuclear safety assurance
DoE Nevada Test Site	Las Vegas, Nevada	Ground testing
DoE Idaho National Engineering Lab	Idaho Falls, Idaho	Ground testing
U.S. Air Force Phillips Lab	Albuquerque, New Mexico	Program management
U.S. Army Corps of Engineers	Huntsville, Alabama	ETS engineering management
Los Alamos National Laboratory	Los Alamos, New Mexico	Fuels and materials testing
Marshall Space Flight Center (NASA)	Huntsville, Alabama	Material and component simulation/testing
Western Test Range/Western Space & Missile Center (USAF)	Vandenberg AFB, California	Program review
Arnold Engineering Development Center	Manchester, Tennessee	Hydrogen flow testing
UNC Manufacturing Company	Uncasville, Connecticut	Materials manufacturing
Grumman Corporation – Calverton Facility	Long Island, New York	Hydrogen testing

The planned ground test facilities were estimated to cost $400M of additional funding to complete in 1992. Fewer than 50 sub-scale tests were planned over three to four years, followed by facility expansions to accommodate five to 25 1000 second full-scale tests of a 2000MW engine.

Initially, PIPET [Particle Bed Reactor Integral Performance Element Tester] was envisioned as a small, low-cost, SNTP-specific experiment for testing and qualifying PBR fuel and fuel elements. The demands by other agencies, DOE and NASA, resulted in a national test facility for NTP fuel, fuel elements, and engines. Its size out grew the SNTP Program's ability to secure the funds for such a large construction project. Though the demands were placed upon the SNTP Program to expand the facility's scope and the SNTP Program's management tried to coordinate tri-agency, DoD-DOE-NASA, support and funding, adequate funding support for the national ground test facility was not obtained.

— SNTP Final Report

The program had technical achievements as well, such as developing high-strength fibers, and carbide coatings for carbon–carbon composites. The hot-section design evolved to use all carbon–carbon to maximize turbine inlet temperature and minimize weight. Carbon–carbon has much lower nuclear heating than other candidate materials, so thermal stresses were minimized as well. Prototype turbine components employing a 2-D polar reinforcement weave were fabricated for use in the corrosive, high-temperature hydrogen environment found in the proposed particle bed reactor (PBR)-powered engine. The particle bed reactor concept required significant radiation shielding, not only for the payload, electronics and structure of the vehicle, but also to prevent unacceptable boil-off of the cryogenic propellant. A propellant-cooled, composite shield of tungsten, which attenuates gamma rays and absorbs thermal neutrons, and lithium hydride, which has a large scattering cross section for fast and thermal neutrons was found to perform well with low mass compared to older boron aluminum titanium hydride (BATH) shields.

Sandia National Labs was responsible for qualification of the coated particle fuel for use in the SNTP nuclear thermal propulsion concept.

SNTP comparison of bleed and expander cycles
	Pro	Con
Bleed cycle	1. Lowest system complexity 2. Minimum reactor internal plumbing & manifolding 3. Development of reactor and balance of plant (BOP) is uncoupled 4. Fast startup easily achieved	Development of high temp turbine and feed lines required
Partial flow expander cycle	1. State of the art turbine technology can be used 2. Higher I_{sp} (c. 0.5%)	1. Coupled reactor and BOP development increases programmatic risk 2. Dedicated fuel elements to supply energy to drive the turbine are of unique design and require additional development
