= NERVA =

US Nuclear thermal rocket engine project (1956–1973)

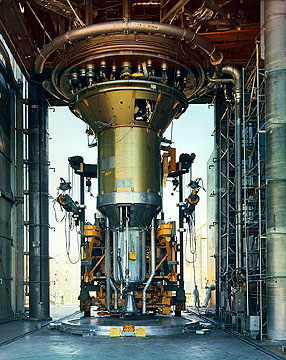
- NERVA XE in ETS-1
- Country of origin: United States
- Designer: Los Alamos Scientific Laboratory
- Manufacturer: Aerojet (engine); Westinghouse (reactor)
- Application: Upper stage engine
- Status: Retired

Liquid-fuel engine
- Propellant: Liquid hydrogen

Performance
- Thrust, vacuum: 246,663 N (55,452 lb_{f})
- Chamber pressure: 3,861 kPa (560 psi)
- Specific impulse, vacuum: 841 seconds (8.25 km/s)
- Specific impulse, sea-level: 710 seconds (7 km/s)
- Burn time: 1,680 seconds
- Restarts: 24

Dimensions
- Length: 6.9 m (23 ft)
- Diameter: 2.59 m (8 ft 6 in)
- Dry mass: 18,144 kg (40,001 lb)

Nuclear reactor
- Operational: 1968 to 1969
- Status: Decommissioned

Main parameters of the reactor core
- Fuel (fissile material): Highly enriched uranium
- Fuel state: Solid
- Neutron energy spectrum: Thermal
- Primary control method: Control drums
- Primary moderator: Nuclear graphite
- Primary coolant: Liquid hydrogen

Reactor usage
- Power (thermal): 1,137 MW

References
- Notes: Figures for XE Prime

The Nuclear Engine for Rocket Vehicle Application (NERVA; /ˈnɜːrvə/) was an American nuclear thermal rocket engine development program that ran for roughly two decades. Its principal objective was to "establish a technology base for nuclear rocket engine systems to be utilized in the design and development of propulsion systems for space mission application". It was a joint effort of the Atomic Energy Commission (AEC) and the National Aeronautics and Space Administration (NASA), and was managed by the Space Nuclear Propulsion Office (SNPO) until the program ended in January 1973. SNPO was led by NASA's Harold Finger and AEC's Milton Klein.

NERVA had its origins in Project Rover, an AEC research project at the Los Alamos Scientific Laboratory (LASL) with the initial aim of providing a nuclear-powered upper stage for the United States Air Force intercontinental ballistic missiles. Nuclear thermal rocket engines promised to be more efficient than chemical ones. After the formation of NASA in 1958, Project Rover was continued as a civilian project and was reoriented to producing a nuclear powered upper stage for NASA's Saturn V Moon rocket. Reactors were tested at very low power before being shipped to Jackass Flats in the Nevada Test Site. While LASL concentrated on reactor development, NASA built and tested complete rocket engines.

The AEC, SNPO, and NASA considered NERVA a highly successful program in that it met or exceeded its program goals. It demonstrated that nuclear thermal rocket engines were a feasible and reliable tool for space exploration, and at the end of 1968 SNPO deemed that the latest NERVA engine, the XE, met the requirements for a human mission to Mars. The program had strong political support from Senators Clinton P. Anderson and Margaret Chase Smith but was cancelled by President Richard Nixon in 1973. Although NERVA engines were built and tested as much as possible with flight-certified components and the engine was deemed ready for integration into a spacecraft, they never flew in space.

== Origins ==
During World War II a collection of scientists at the Manhattan Project's Los Alamos Laboratory, where the first atomic bombs were designed, including Stan Ulam, Frederick Reines and Frederic de Hoffmann, speculated on the development of nuclear-powered rockets. In 1946, Ulam and C. J. Everett wrote a paper in which they considered the use of atomic bombs as a means of rocket propulsion. This would become the basis for Project Orion.

The public revelation of atomic energy at the end of World War II generated a great deal of speculation, and in the United Kingdom, Val Cleaver, the chief engineer of the rocket division at De Havilland, and Leslie Shepherd, a nuclear physicist at the University of Cambridge, independently considered the problem of nuclear rocket propulsion. They became collaborators, and in a series of papers published in the Journal of the British Interplanetary Society in 1948 and 1949, they outlined the design of a nuclear-powered rocket with a solid-core graphite heat exchanger. They reluctantly concluded that although nuclear thermal rockets were essential for deep space exploration, they were not yet technically feasible.

In 1953, Robert W. Bussard, a physicist working on the Nuclear Energy for the Propulsion of Aircraft (NEPA) project at the Oak Ridge National Laboratory wrote a detailed study on "Nuclear Energy for Rocket Propulsion". He had read Cleaver and Shepard's work, that of the Chinese physicist Hsue-Shen Tsien, and a February 1952 report by engineers at Consolidated Vultee. Bussard's study had little impact at first because only 29 copies were printed, and it was classified as Restricted Data, and therefore could only be read by someone with the required security clearance. In December 1953, it was published in Oak Ridge's Journal of Reactor Science and Technology. The paper was still classified, as was the journal, but this gave it a wider circulation. Darol Froman, the deputy director of the Los Alamos Scientific Laboratory (LASL), and Herbert York, the director of the University of California Radiation Laboratory at Livermore, were interested and established committees to investigate nuclear rocket propulsion. Froman brought Bussard out to LASL to assist for one week per month.

Bussard's study also attracted the attention of John von Neumann, who formed an ad hoc committee for nuclear propulsion of missiles. Mark Mills, the assistant director at Livermore was its chairman, and its other members were Norris Bradbury from LASL; Edward Teller and Herbert York from Livermore; Abe Silverstein, the associate director of the National Advisory Committee for Aeronautics (NACA) Lewis Flight Propulsion Laboratory, a federal agency that conducted aeronautical research; and Allen F. Donovan from Ramo-Wooldridge, an aerospace corporation. After hearing input on several designs, the Mills committee recommended in March 1955 that development proceed, with the aim of producing a nuclear rocket upper stage for an intercontinental ballistic missile (ICBM). York created a new division at Livermore, and Bradbury created a new one called N Division at LASL under the leadership of Raemer Schreiber, to pursue it. In March 1956, the Armed Forces Special Weapons Project (AFSWP), the agency responsible for the management of the national nuclear weapons stockpile, recommended allocating $100 million to the nuclear rocket engine project over three years for the two laboratories to conduct feasibility studies and the construction of test facilities.

Eger V. Murphree and Herbert Loper at the Atomic Energy Commission (AEC) were more cautious. The Atlas missile program was proceeding well, and if successful would have sufficient range to hit targets in most of the Soviet Union. At the same time, nuclear warheads were becoming smaller, lighter and more powerful. The case for a new technology that promised heavier payloads over longer distances therefore seemed weak. However, the nuclear rocket had acquired a political patron in Senator Clinton P. Anderson from New Mexico (where LASL was located). The deputy chairman of the United States Congress Joint Committee on Atomic Energy (JCAE), Anderson was close to von Neumann, Bradbury and Ulam. He managed to secure funding in January 1957.

All work on the nuclear rocket was consolidated at LASL, where it was given the codename Project Rover; Livermore was assigned responsibility for the development of the nuclear ramjet, which was codenamed Project Pluto. Project Rover was directed by an active duty United States Air Force (USAF) officer seconded to the AEC, Lieutenant Colonel Harold R. Schmidt. He was answerable to another seconded USAF officer, Colonel Jack L. Armstrong, who was also in charge of Pluto and the Systems for Nuclear Auxiliary Power (SNAP) projects.

== Project Rover ==
=== Underlying concepts ===
Rocket engines create thrust by accelerating a working mass in a direction opposite to their desired trajectory. In conventional designs, this is accomplished by heating a fluid and allowing it to escape through a rocket nozzle. The energy needed to produce the heat is provided by a chemical reaction in the fuel, which may be mixed together as in the case of most solid fuel rockets, or separate tanks as in most liquid fuel rockets. Selecting the fuels to use is a complex task that has to consider the reaction energy, the mass of the fuel, the mass of the resulting working fluid, and other practical concerns like density and its ability to be easily pumped.

Nuclear rocket engines use a nuclear reactor to provide the energy to heat the fuel instead of a chemical reaction. Because nuclear reactions are much more powerful than chemical ones, a large volume of chemicals can be replaced by a small reactor. As the heat source is independent of the working mass, the working fluid can be selected for maximum performance for a given task, not its underlying reaction energy. Due to its low molecular mass, hydrogen is normally used. This combination of features allows a nuclear engine to outperform a chemical one; they generally aim to have at least twice the specific impulse of a chemical engine.

=== Design concepts ===
In general form, a nuclear engine is similar to a liquid chemical engine. Both hold the working mass in a large tank and pump it to the reaction chamber using a turbopump. The difference is primarily in that the reaction chamber is generally larger, the size of the reactor. Complicating factors were immediately apparent. The first was that a means had to be found of controlling reactor temperature and power output. The second was that a means had to be devised to hold the propellant. The only practical means of storing hydrogen was in liquid form, and this required temperatures below 20 K (−253.2 °C). The third was that the hydrogen would be heated to a temperature of around 2,500 K (2,230 °C), and materials were required that could both withstand such temperatures and resist corrosion by hydrogen.

For the fuel, plutonium-239, uranium-235 and uranium-233 were considered. Plutonium was rejected because it forms compounds easily and could not reach temperatures as high as those of uranium. Uranium-233 is slightly lighter than uranium-235, releases a higher number of neutrons per fission event on average, and has higher probability of fission, but its radioactive properties make it more difficult to handle, and it was not readily available. Uranium-235 was therefore chosen.

For structural materials in the reactor, the choice came down to graphite or metal. Of the metals, tungsten emerged as the front runner, but it was expensive, hard to fabricate, and had undesirable neutronic properties. To get around its neutronic properties, it was suggested tungsten-184, which does not absorb neutrons, should be used. On the other hand, graphite was cheap, actually gets stronger at temperatures up to 3,300 K (3,030 °C), and sublimes rather than melts at 3,900 K (3,630 °C). Graphite was therefore chosen.

To control the reactor, the core was surrounded by control drums coated with graphite or beryllium (a neutron moderator) on one side and boron (a neutron poison) on the other. The reactor's power output could be controlled by rotating the drums. To increase thrust, it is sufficient to increase the flow of propellant. Hydrogen, whether in pure form or in a compound like ammonia, is an efficient nuclear moderator, and increasing the flow also increases the rate of reactions in the core. This increased reaction rate offsets the cooling provided by the hydrogen. Moreover, as the hydrogen heats up, it expands, so there is less in the core to remove heat, and the temperature will level off. These opposing effects stabilize the reactivity and a nuclear rocket engine is therefore naturally very stable, and the thrust is easily controlled by varying the hydrogen flow without changing the control drums.

NERVA incorporated a radiation shield to protect personnel and external components from the intense neutron and photon radiation it emitted. An efficient lightweight shield material was developed by the Aerojet Nuclear Systems Company from a mixture of boron carbide (B_{4}C), aluminum and titanium hydride (TiH_{2}), known as BATH after its components. Titanium hydride is an excellent neutron moderator and boron carbide an excellent neutron absorber. The three components were mixed in powdered form and a commercial extrusion machine was used to extrude them into the desired shape. BATH was found to be strong, with a tensile strength of up to 190,000 kilopascals (28,000 psi), capable of withstanding high temperatures, and with superior radiation shielding properties.

LASL produced a series of design concepts, each with its own codename: Uncle Tom, Uncle Tung, Bloodhound and Shish. By 1955, it had settled on a 1,500 MW design called Old Black Joe. In 1956, this became the basis of a 2,700 MW design intended to be the upper stage of an ICBM.

=== Test site ===
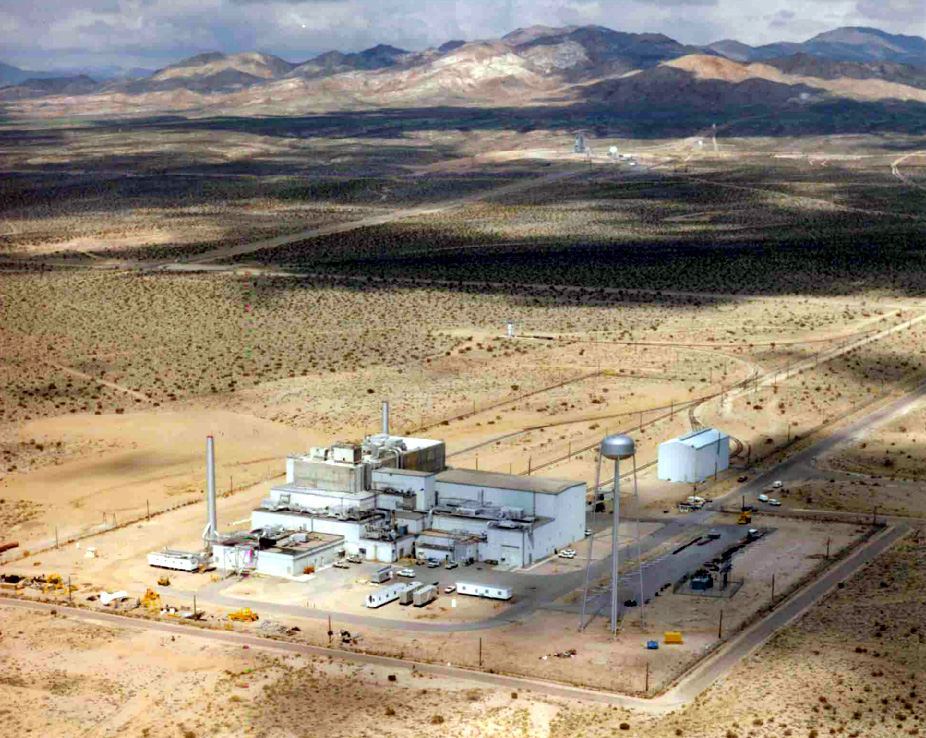
Engine maintenance assembly and disassembly (E-MAD) facility

Nuclear reactors for Project Rover were built at LASL Technical Area 18 (TA-18), also known as the Pajarito Site. The reactors were tested at very low power before being shipped to Jackass Flats in the Nevada Test Site. Testing of fuel elements and other materials science was done by the LASL N Division at TA-46 using several ovens and later the Nuclear Furnace.

Work commenced on test facilities at Jackass Flats in mid-1957. All materials and supplies had to be brought in from Las Vegas. Test Cell A consisted of a farm of hydrogen gas bottles and a concrete wall 1 meter (3 ft) thick to protect the electronic instrumentation from radiation produced by the reactor. The control room was located 3.2 kilometers (2 mi) away. The reactor was test fired with its plume in the air so that radioactive products could be safely dissipated.

The reactor maintenance and disassembly building (R-MAD) was in most respects a typical hot cell used by the nuclear industry, with thick concrete walls, lead glass viewing windows, and remote manipulation arms. It was exceptional only for its size: 76 meters (250 ft) long, 43 meters (140 ft) wide and 19 meters (63 ft) high. This allowed the engine to be moved in and out on a railroad car.

The "Jackass and Western Railroad", as it was light-heartedly described, was said to be the world's shortest and slowest railroad. There were two locomotives, the remotely controlled electric L-1, and the diesel/electric L-2, which was manually controlled but had radiation shielding around the cab. The former was normally used; the latter was provided as a backup. Construction workers were housed in Mercury, Nevada. Later thirty mobile homes were brought to Jackass Flats to create a village named "Boyerville" after the supervisor, Keith Boyer. Construction work was completed in the fall of 1958. NASA planned to develop a community of 2,700 people, with 800 dwellings and their own shopping complex by 1967.

== Organization ==
=== Transfer to NASA ===
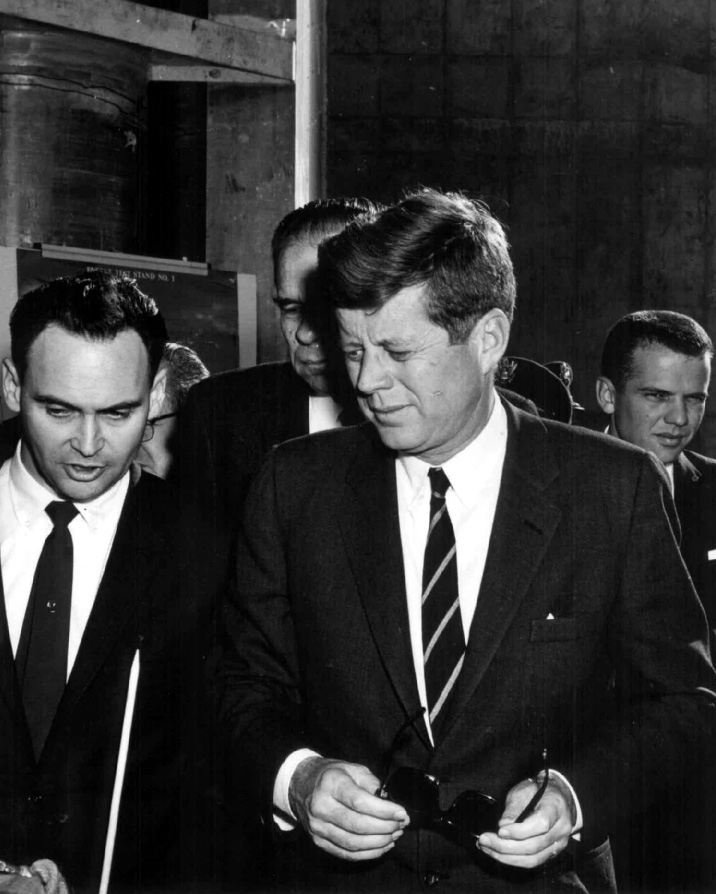
President John F. Kennedy (right) visits the Nuclear Rocket Development Station on 8 December 1962 with Harold Finger (left) and Glenn Seaborg (behind)

By 1957, the Atlas missile project was proceeding well, and the need for a nuclear upper stage had all but disappeared. On 2 October 1957, the AEC proposed cutting its budget. Two days later, the Soviet Union launched Sputnik 1, the first artificial satellite. This surprise success fired fears and imaginations around the world. It demonstrated that the Soviet Union had the capability to deliver nuclear weapons over intercontinental distances, and contested cherished American notions of military, economic and technological superiority. This precipitated the Sputnik crisis, and triggered the Space Race. President Dwight D. Eisenhower responded by creating ARPA to oversee military rocket and technology development, and the National Aeronautics and Space Administration (NASA) to direct civilian rocket development. NASA absorbed NACA as part of its formation, along with several former military programs.

NACA had long been interested in nuclear technology. In 1951, it had begun exploring the possibility of acquiring its own nuclear reactor for the aircraft nuclear propulsion (ANP) project, and selected its Lewis Flight Propulsion Laboratory in Ohio to design, build and manage it. A site was chosen at the nearby Plum Brook Ordnance Works, NACA obtained approval from the AEC, and construction of the Plum Brook Reactor commenced in September 1956. Abe Silverstein, the director of Lewis, was particularly eager to acquire control of Project Rover.

Donald A. Quarles, the Deputy Secretary of Defense, met with T. Keith Glennan, the new administrator of NASA, and Hugh Dryden, Glennan's deputy on 20 August 1958, the day they after Glennan and Dryden were sworn into office at the White House, and Rover was the first item on the agenda. Quarles was eager to transfer Rover to NASA, as the project no longer had a military purpose. Responsibility for the non-nuclear components of Project Rover was officially transferred from the United States Air Force (USAF) to NASA on 1 October 1958, the day NASA officially became operational and assumed responsibility for the US civilian space program.

=== Space Nuclear Propulsion Office ===
Project Rover became a joint NASA–AEC project. Silverstein, whom Glennan had brought to Washington, DC, to organise NASA's spaceflight program, appointed Harold Finger to oversee the nuclear rocket development as head of NASA's Office of Space Reactors. Senator Anderson had doubts about Finger's suitability for the job. He felt that Finger lacked enthusiasm for it. Glenn met with Anderson on 13 April 1959, and convinced him that Finger would do a good job. On 29 August 1960, NASA created the Space Nuclear Propulsion Office (SNPO) to oversee the nuclear rocket project. Finger was appointed as its manager, with Milton Klein from AEC as his deputy. Finger was also the Director of Nuclear Systems in the NASA Office of Advanced Research and Technology. A formal "Agreement Between NASA and AEC on Management of Nuclear Rocket Engine Contracts" was signed by NASA Deputy Administrator Robert Seamans and AEC General Manager Alvin Luedecke on 1 February 1961. This was followed by an "Inter-Agency Agreement on the Program for the Development of Space Nuclear Rocket Propulsion (Project Rover)", which they signed on 28 July 1961. SNPO also assumed responsibility for SNAP, Armstrong becoming assistant to the director of the Reactor Development Division at AEC, and Lieutenant Colonel G. M. Anderson, formerly the SNAP project officer in the disbanded ANP Office, became chief of the SNAP Branch in the new division. It soon became apparent that there were considerable cultural differences between NASA and AEC.

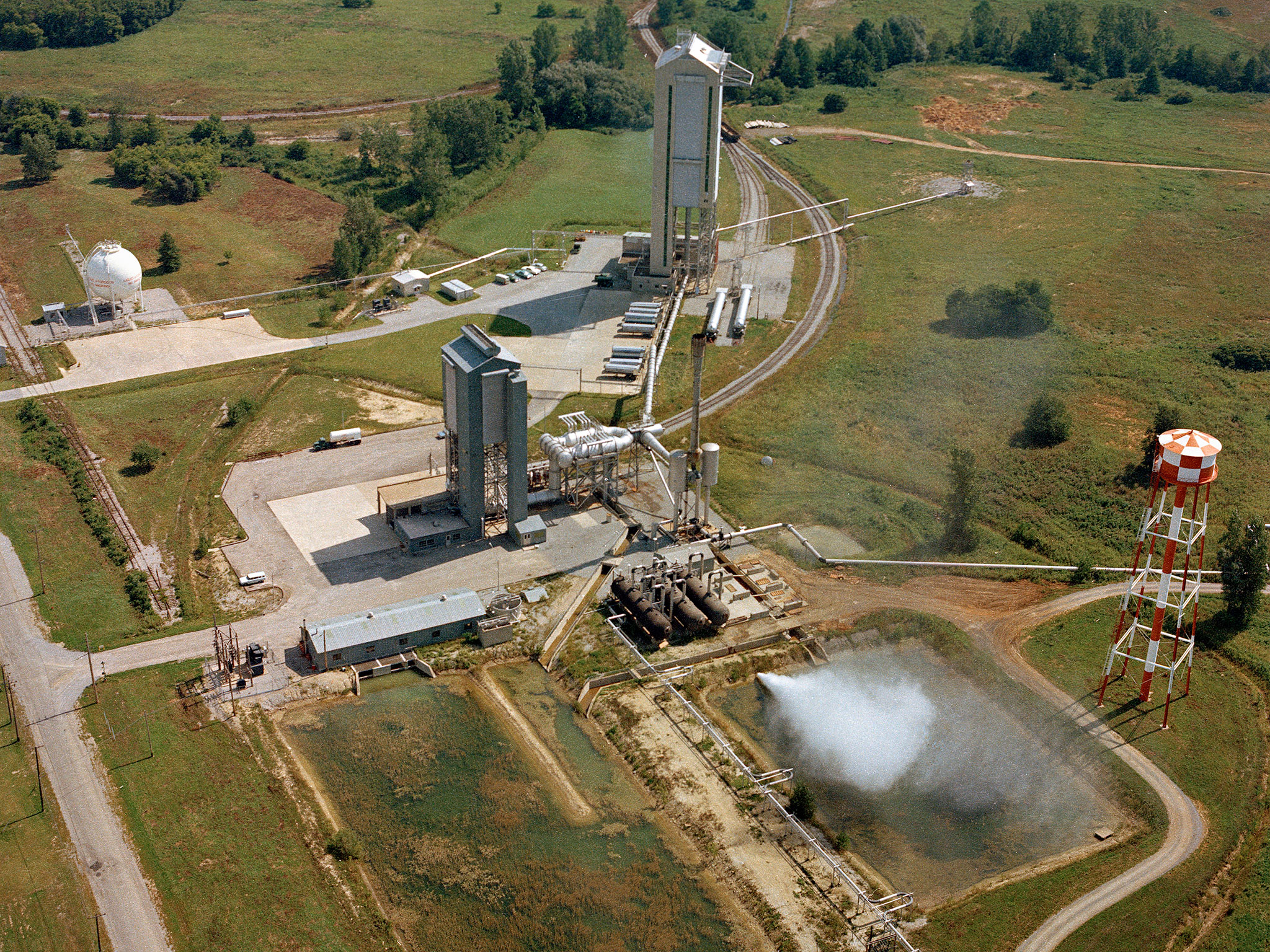
The High Energy Rocket Engine Research Facility (B-1) (left) and Nuclear Rocket Dynamics and Control Facility (B-3) (right) at NASA's Plum Brook Station in Sandusky, Ohio, were constructed in the early 1960s to test full-scale liquid hydrogen fuel systems in simulated altitude conditions.

SNPO Headquarters was co-located with AEC Headquarters in Germantown, Maryland. Finger established branch offices at Albuquerque, New Mexico, (SNPO-A) to liaise with LASL, and in Cleveland, Ohio, (SNPO-C) to coordinate with the Lewis Research Center, which was activated in October 1961. In February 1962, NASA announced the establishment of the Nuclear Rocket Development Station (NRDS) at Jackass Flats, and in June an SNPO branch was established at Las Vegas (SNPO-N) to manage it. By the end of 1963, there were 13 NASA personnel at SNPO Headquarters, 59 at SNPO-C and 30 at SNPO-N. SNPO staff were a combination of NASA and AEC employees whose responsibilities included "program and resource planning and evaluation, the justification and distribution of program resources, the definition and control of overall program requirements, monitoring and reporting of progress and problems to NASA and AEC management, and the preparation of testimony to Congress."

Finger called for bids from industry for the development of the nuclear engine for rocket vehicle application (NERVA) based upon the Kiwi engine developed by LASL. The award was scheduled for 1 March 1961, so that the decision whether or not to proceed could be made by the incoming Kennedy administration. Eight companies submitted bids: Aerojet, Douglas, Glenn L. Martin, Lockheed, North American, Rocketdyne, Thiokol and Westinghouse. A joint NASA–AEC board evaluated the bids. It rated North American's bid as the best bid overall, but Westinghouse and Aerojet had superior bids for the reactor and engine respectively when they were considered separately. After Aerojet promised NASA administrator James E. Webb that it would put its best people on NERVA, Webb spoke to the selection board and told them that although he did not wish to influence their decision, North American was deeply committed to Project Apollo, and the board might consider combining other bids. On 8 June, Webb announced that Aerojet and Westinghouse had been selected. Aerojet became the prime contractor, with Westinghouse as the principal subcontractor. Both companies recruited aggressively, and by 1963, Westinghouse had 1,100 staff working on NERVA.

In March 1961, President John F. Kennedy announced the cancellation of the aircraft nuclear propulsion project just as NASA's Plum Brook reactor was nearing completion, and for a time it seemed that NERVA would soon follow. NASA estimated that NERVA would ultimately cost $800 million (although AEC reckoned that it would be much less), and the Bureau of the Budget argued that NERVA made sense only in the context of a crewed lunar landing or flights further into the Solar System, to neither of which had the administration committed. Then, on 12 April, the Soviet Union launched Yuri Gagarin into orbit on Vostok 1, once again demonstrating its technological superiority. A few days later, Kennedy launched the disastrous Bay of Pigs Invasion of Cuba, resulting in yet another humiliation for the United States. On 25 May, he addressed a joint session of Congress. "First," he announced, "I believe that this nation should commit itself to achieving the goal, before this decade is out, of landing a man on the moon and returning him safely to the earth." He then went on to say: "Secondly, an additional 23 million dollars, together with 7 million dollars already available, will accelerate development of the Rover nuclear rocket. This gives promise of someday providing a means for even more exciting and ambitious exploration of space, perhaps beyond the moon, perhaps to the very end of the Solar System itself."

== Towards Reactor In-Flight Tests ==
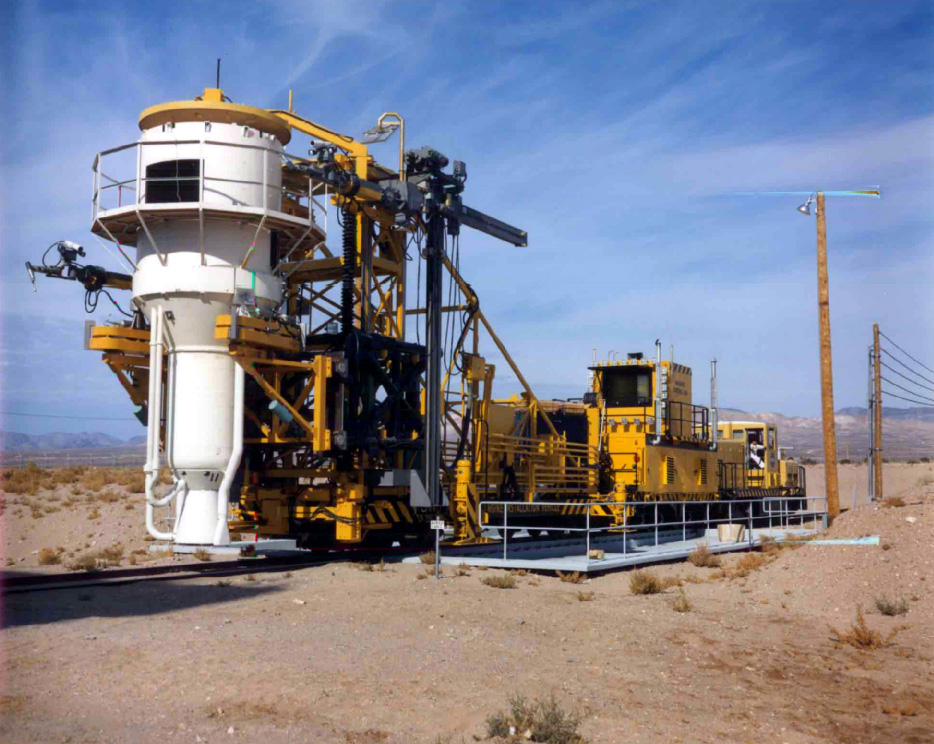
Wooden mock-up of a NERVA engine on the engine installation vehicle (EIV) near the E-MAD

The SNPO set an objective for NERVA of 99.7 percent reliability, meaning that the engine would fail to perform as designed no more than three times in every thousand starts. To achieve this, Aerojet and Westinghouse estimated that they would require 6 reactors, 28 engines and 6 reactor in-flight test (RIFT) flights. They planned for 42 tests, considerably fewer than the 60 tests that the SNPO had thought might be required. Unlike other aspects of NERVA, RIFT was solely a NASA responsibility. NASA delegated responsibility for RIFT to Wernher von Braun's Marshall Space Flight Center (MSFC) in Huntsville, Alabama. Von Braun created a Nuclear Vehicle Projects Office at MSFC, headed by Colonel Scott Fellows, a USAF officer who had worked on ANP.

At this time, NASA was engaged in planning for the lunar landing mission that Kennedy had called for. In the process the agency considered several booster concepts, including what became the Saturn family and the larger Nova. These were chemical rockets, although nuclear upper stages were also considered for Nova. The December 1959 Silverstein Committee had defined the configuration of the Saturn launch vehicle, including the use of liquid hydrogen as the fuel for the upper stages.

In a 1960 paper, Schmidt proposed replacing the upper stages with nuclear NERVA stages. This would deliver the same performance as Nova, but for half the cost. He estimated the cost of putting a pound of payload into lunar orbit as $1,600 for an all-chemical Saturn, $1,100 for Nova, and $700 for a chemical-nuclear Saturn. MSFC issued a study contract for a RIFT with NERVA as the upper stage of a Saturn C-3, but the C-3 was replaced soon after by the more powerful C-4 and ultimately the C-5, which became the Saturn V. Only in July 1962, after much debate, did NASA finally settle on lunar orbit rendezvous, which could be performed by Saturn V, negating the need for the larger and more expensive Nova, which was abandoned.

The RIFT test vehicle would be 111 meters (364 ft) tall, about the same as the Saturn V; the Saturn C-5N mission configuration would be larger still, at 120 meters (393 ft) tall, but the 160-meter (525 ft) Vehicle Assembly Building (VAB) could easily accommodate it. It would consist of an S-IC first stage, a dummy S-II middle stage filled with water, and an S-N (Saturn-Nuclear) NERVA upper stage. For an actual mission, a real S-II stage would be used. The S-N stage was to be built by Lockheed in a dirigible hangar NASA acquired at Moffet Field in Sunnyvale, California, and assembled at NASA's Mississippi Test Facility.

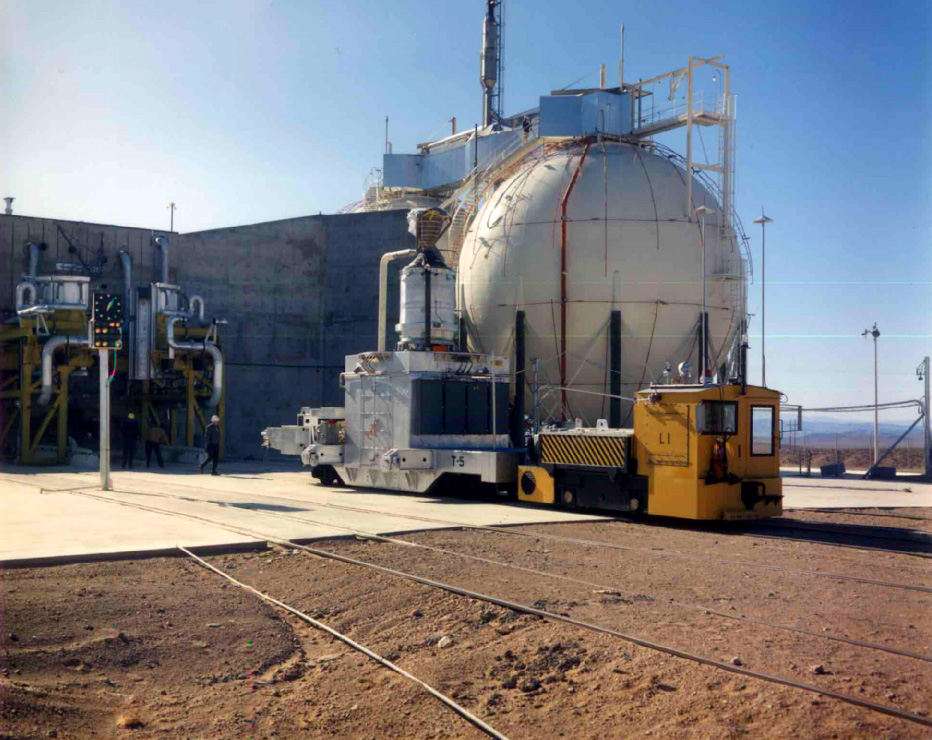
Nevada Test Site. XE Prime engine before test at ETS-1

The SNPO planned to build ten S-N stages, six for ground tests and four for flight tests. Launches were to take place from Cape Canaveral. NERVA engines would be transported by road in shockproof, watertight containers, with the control rods locked in place and nuclear poison wires in the core. Since it would not be radioactive, it could be safely transported and mated to the lower stages without shielding. In flight, the poison wires would be pulled and the reactor started 121 kilometers (75 mi) above the Atlantic Ocean. The engine would fire for 1,300 seconds, boosting it to an altitude of 480 kilometers (300 mi). It would then be shut down, and the reactor cooled before impacting the Atlantic 3,200 kilometers (2,000 mi) downrange. NERVA would be regarded as mission ready after four successful tests.

To support RIFT, LASL established a Rover Flight Safety Office and SNPO created a Rover Flight Safety Panel. Since RIFT called for up to four reactors to fall into the Atlantic Ocean, LASL attempted to determine what would happen when a reactor hit the water at several thousand kilometers per hour. In particular, whether it would go critical or explode when flooded with sea water, a neutron moderator. There was also concern about what would happen when it sank 3.2 kilometers (2 mi) down to the bottom of the Atlantic, where it would be under a crushing pressure. The possible impact on marine life, and indeed what marine life was down there, all had to be considered.

The main bottleneck in the NERVA program was the test facilities at Jackass Flats. Test Cell C was supposed to be complete in 1960. NASA and AEC did not request funds for further construction, but Anderson provided them anyway. There were construction delays, forcing Anderson to intervene personally. He assumed the role of de facto construction manager, with the AEC officials reporting directly to him.

In August 1961, the Soviet Union ended the nuclear test moratorium that had been in place since November 1958, so Kennedy resumed US nuclear weapons testing in September. With a second crash program at the Nevada Test site, labor became scarce, and there was a strike. When that ended, the workers had to come to grips with the difficulties of dealing with hydrogen, which could leak through microscopic holes that were too small for other fluids to pass through. On 7 November 1961, a minor accident caused a violent hydrogen release. The complex finally became operational in 1964. SNPO envisaged the construction of a 20,000 MW nuclear rocket engine, so Boyer had the Chicago Bridge & Iron Company construct two gigantic 1,900,000-litre (500,000 US gal) cryogenic storage dewars. An engine maintenance and disassembly building (E-MAD) was added. It had thick concrete walls and shield bays where engines could be assembled and disassembled. There was also an engine test stand (ETS-1); two more were planned.

In March 1963, SNPO and MSFC commissioned Space Technology Laboratories (STL) to produce a report on what kind of nuclear rocket engine would be required for possible missions between 1975 and 1990. These missions included early crewed planetary interplanetary round-trip expeditions (EMPIRE), planetary swingbys and flybys, and a lunar shuttle. The conclusion of this nine-volume report, which was delivered in March 1965, and of a follow-up study, was that these missions could be carried out with a 4,100 MW engine with a specific impulse of 825 seconds (8.09 km/s). This was considerably smaller than had originally been thought necessary. From this emerged a specification for a 5,000 MW nuclear rocket engine, which became known as NERVA II.

== Engine development ==
=== Kiwi ===
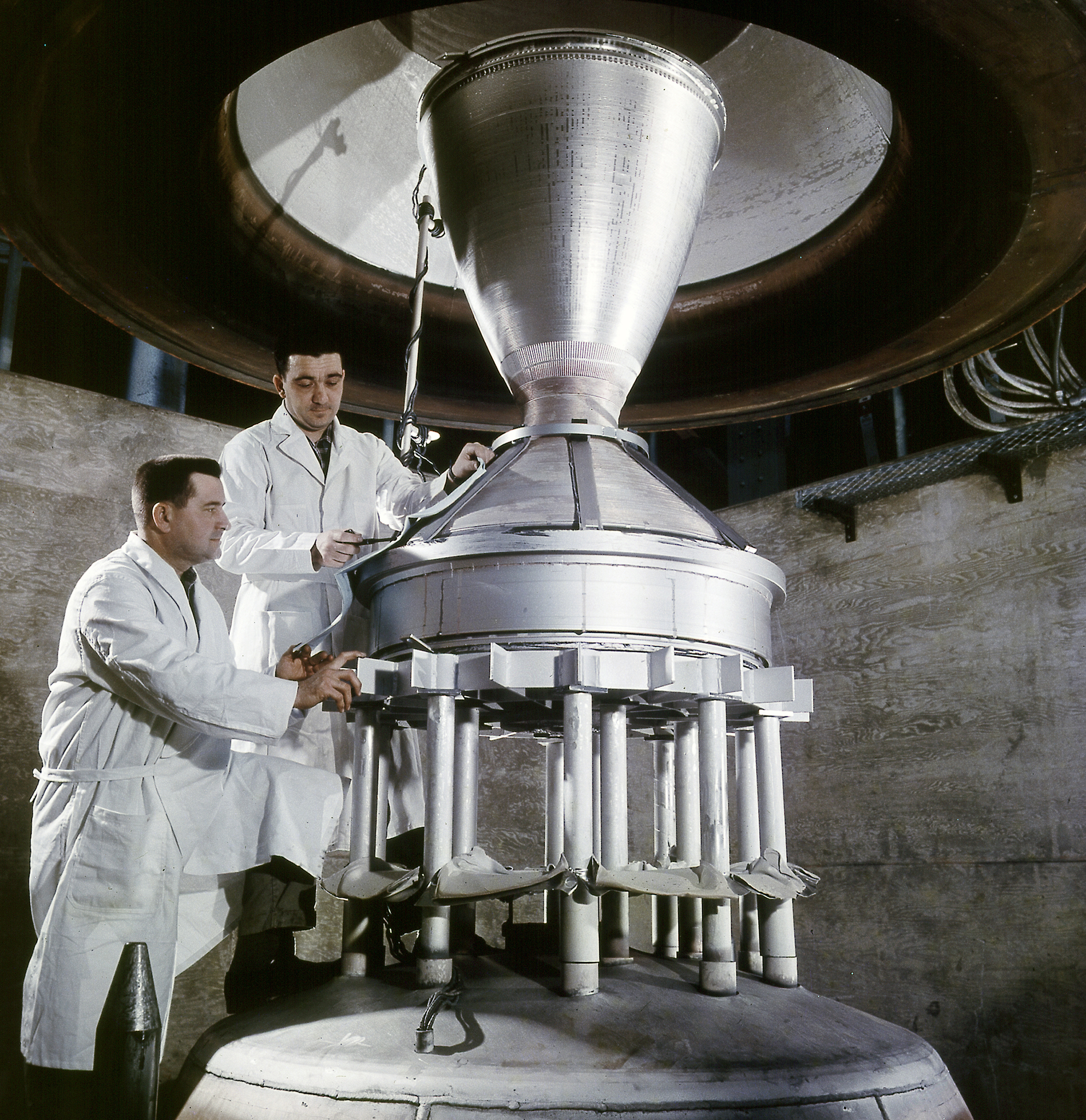
Technicians in a vacuum furnace at the NASA Lewis' Fabrication Shop prepare a Kiwi B-1 nozzle for testing.

The first phase of Project Rover, Kiwi, was named after the New Zealand kiwi bird. A kiwi cannot fly, and the Kiwi rocket engines were not intended to do so either. Their function was to verify the design, and test the behavior of the materials used. The Kiwi program developed a series of non-flyable test nuclear engines, the primary focus being to improve the technology of hydrogen-cooled reactors. In the Kiwi A series of tests conducted between July 1959 and October 1960, three reactors were built and tested. Kiwi A was considered a success as a proof of concept for nuclear rocket engines. It demonstrated that hydrogen could be heated in a nuclear reactor to the temperatures required for space propulsion and that the reactor could be controlled.

The next step was the Kiwi B series of tests, which commenced with Kiwi B1A on 7 December 1961. This was a development of the Kiwi A engine, with a series of improvements. The second test in the series, Kiwi B1B on 1 September 1962, resulted in extreme structural damage to the reactor, fuel module components being ejected as it was ramped up to full power. A subsequent full-power Kiwi B4A test on 30 November 1962, along with a series of cold flow tests, revealed that the problem was vibrations that were induced when the hydrogen was heated as the reactor was being brought up to full power rather than when it was running at full power. Unlike a chemical engine that would likely have blown up after suffering catastrophic damage, the nuclear rocket engine remained stable and controllable even when tested to destruction. The tests demonstrated that a nuclear rocket engine would be rugged and reliable in space.

Kennedy visited LASL on 7 December 1962 for a briefing on Project Rover. It was the first time a president had visited a nuclear weapons laboratory. He brought with him a large entourage that included Lyndon Johnson, McGeorge Bundy, Jerome Wiesner, Harold Brown, Donald Hornig, Glenn Seaborg, Robert Seamans, Harold Finger, Clinton Anderson, Howard Cannon and Alan Bible. The next day, they flew to Jackass Flats, making Kennedy the only president to ever visit a nuclear test site. Project Rover had received $187 million in 1962, and AEC and NASA were asking for another $360 million in 1963. Kennedy drew attention to his administration's budgetary difficulties, and asked what the relationship was between Project Rover and Apollo. Finger replied that it was an insurance policy, and could be used in the later Apollo or post-Apollo missions, such as a base on the Moon or a mission to Mars. Wiesner, supported by Brown and Hornig, argued that if a Mars mission could not occur before the 1980s, then RIFT could be postponed to the 1970s. Seamans noted that such an attitude had resulted in the Sputnik crisis and a loss of American prestige and influence.

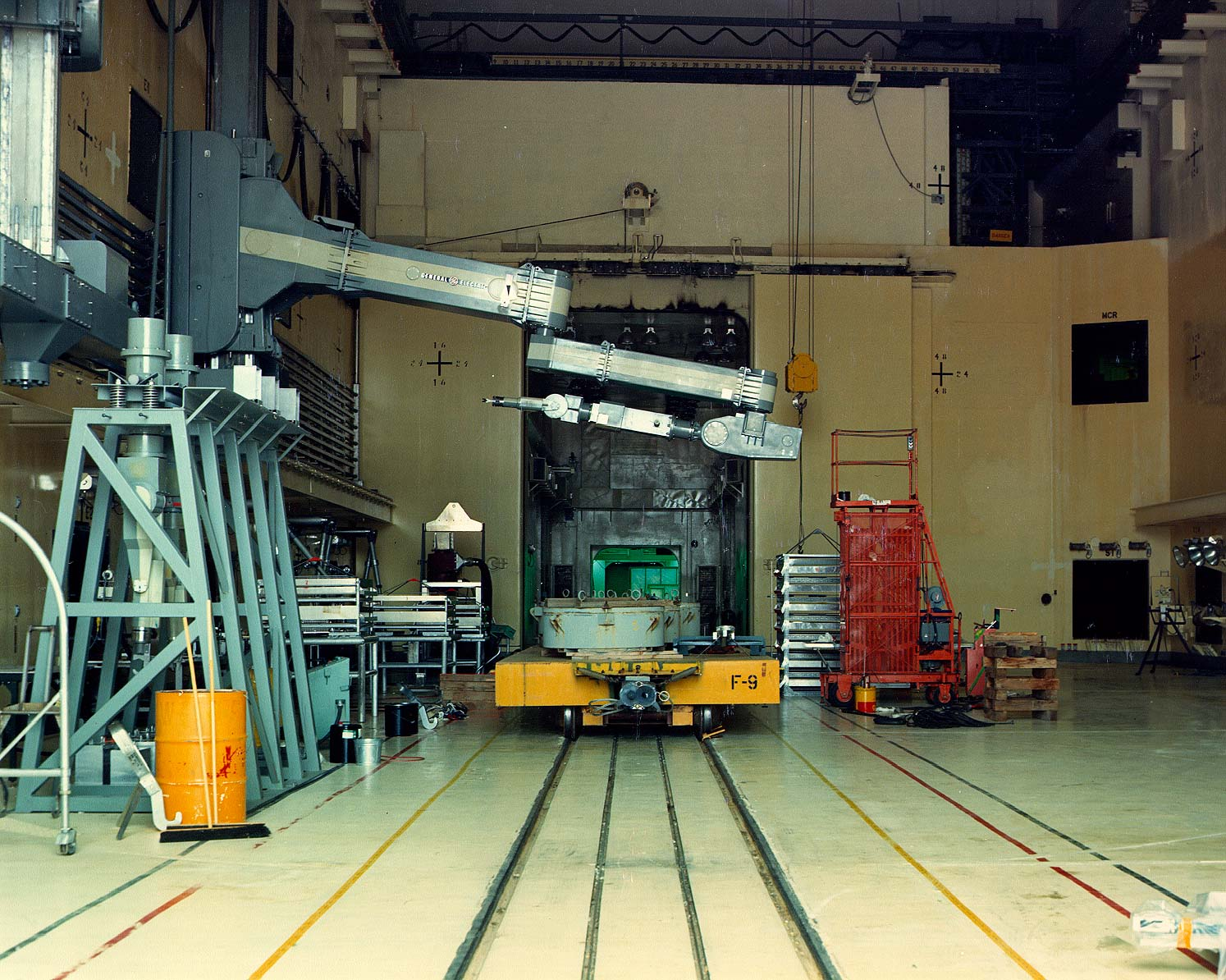
Inside the E-MAD

In January 1963, Senator Anderson became chairman of the United States Senate Committee on Aeronautical and Space Sciences. He met privately with Kennedy, who agreed to request a supplemental appropriation for RIFT if a "quick fix" to the Kiwi vibration problem that Seaborg promised could be implemented. In the meantime, Finger called a meeting. He declared that there would be no "quick fix". He criticized LASL's management structure and called for LASL to adopt a project management structure. He wanted the case of the vibration problems thoroughly investigated, and the cause definitely known before corrective action was taken. Three SNPO staff (known at LASL as the "three blind mice") were assigned to LASL to ensure that his instructions were carried out. Finger assembled a team of vibration specialists from other NASA centers, and along with staff from LASL, Aerojet and Westinghouse, conducted a series of "cold flow" reactor tests using fuel elements without fissionable material. RIFT was cancelled in December 1963. Although its reinstatement was frequently discussed, it never occurred.

A series of design changes were made to address the vibration problem. In the Kiwi B4D test on 13 May 1964, the reactor was automatically started and briefly run at full power with no vibration problems. This was followed by the Kiwi B4E test on 28 August in which the reactor was operated for twelve minutes, eight of which were at full power. On 10 September, Kiwi B4E was restarted, and run at full power for two and a half minutes, demonstrating the ability of a nuclear rocket engine to be shut down and restarted. In September, tests were conducted with a Kiwi B4 engine and PARKA, a Kiwi reactor used for testing at LASL. The two reactors were run 4.9 meters (16 ft), 2.7 meters (9 ft) and 1.8 meters (6 ft) apart, and reactivity measurements were taken. These tests showed that neutrons produced by one reactor did indeed cause fissions in another, but that the effect was negligible: 3, 12 and 24 cents respectively. The tests demonstrated that nuclear rocket engines can be clustered, just as chemical ones often are.

=== NERVA NRX ===
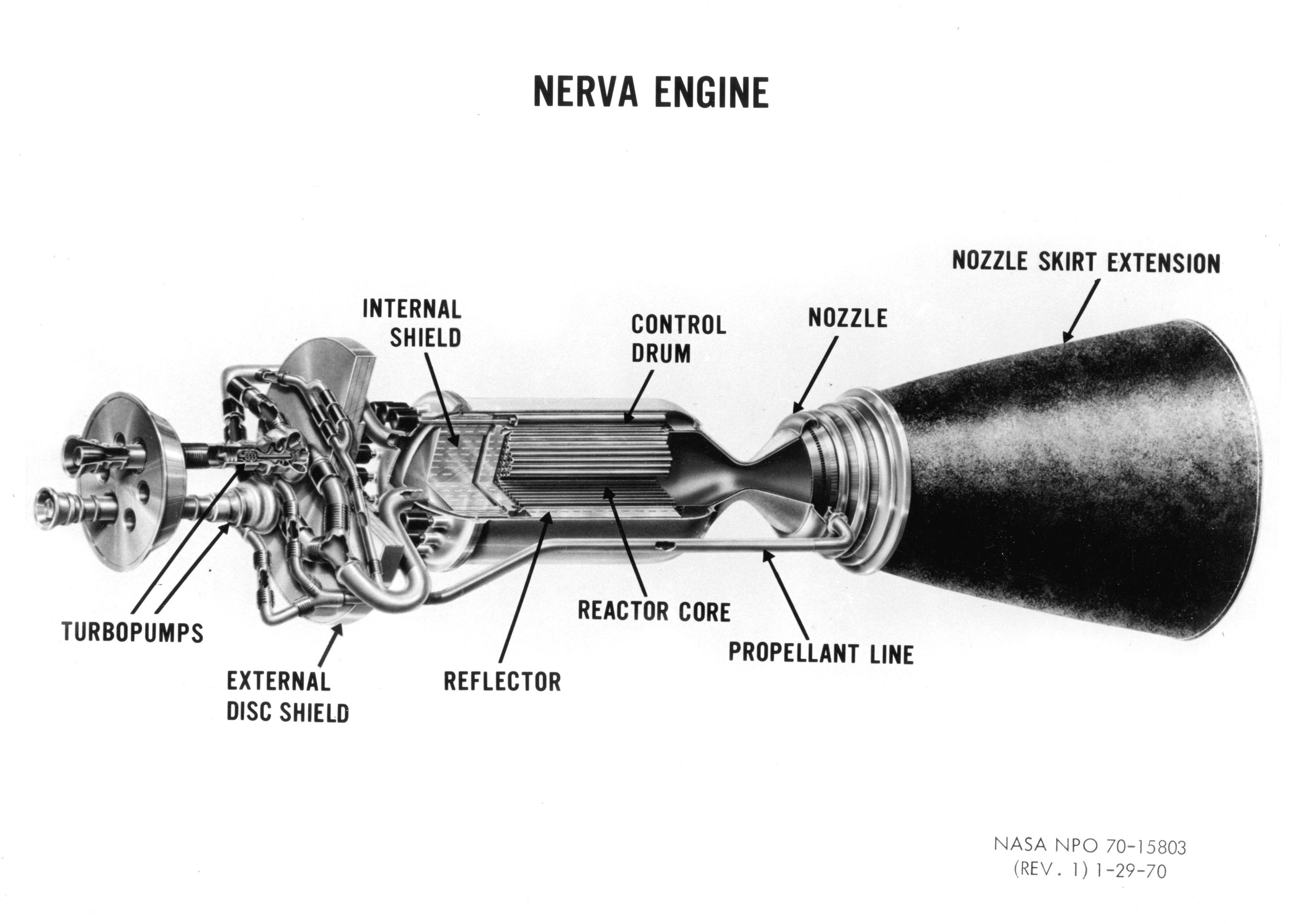
NERVA nuclear rocket engine

SNPO chose the 330,000-newton (75,000 lbf) Kiwi-B4 nuclear thermal rocket design (with a specific impulse of 825 seconds) as the baseline for the NERVA NRX (NERVA Reactor Experiment). Whereas Kiwi was a proof of concept, NERVA NRX was a prototype of a complete engine. That meant that it would need actuators to turn the drums and start the engine, gimbals to control its movement, a nozzle cooled by liquid hydrogen, and shielding to protect the engine, payload and crew from radiation. Westinghouse modified the cores to make them more robust for flight conditions. Some research and development was still required. The available temperature sensors were accurate only up to 1,980 K (1,710 °C), far below what was required. New sensors were developed that were accurate to 2,649 K (2,376 °C) , even in a high-radiation environment. Aerojet and Westinghouse attempted to theoretically predict the performance of each component. This was then compared to the actual test performance. Over time, the two converged as more was understood. By 1972, the performance of a NERVA engine under most conditions could be accurately forecast.

The first test of a NERVA engine was of NERVA A2 on 24 September 1964. Aerojet and Westinghouse cautiously increased the power incrementally, to 2 MW, 570 MW, 940 MW, running for a minute or two at each level to check the instruments, before finally increasing to full power at 1,096 MW. The reactor ran flawlessly, and only had to be shut down after 40 seconds because the hydrogen was running out. The test demonstrated that NERVA had the designed specific impulse of 811 seconds (7.95 km/s); solid-propellant rockets have a maximum impulse of around 300 seconds (2.9 km/s) and chemical rockets with liquid propellant seldom achieve more than 450 seconds (4.4 km/s). Executives at Aerojet and Westinghouse were so pleased they took out a full-page ad in the Wall Street Journal with a picture of the test and the caption: "On to Mars!" The reactor was restarted on 15 October. Originally this was intended to test the nozzle, but that was dropped as it was close to its design maximum of 2,270 K (2,000 °C). Instead, the turbopump was tested. The engine was powered up to 40 MW, the control drums were locked in place, and the turbopump was used to keep the power steady at 40 MW. It worked perfectly. The computer simulations had been correct, and the whole project was ahead of schedule.

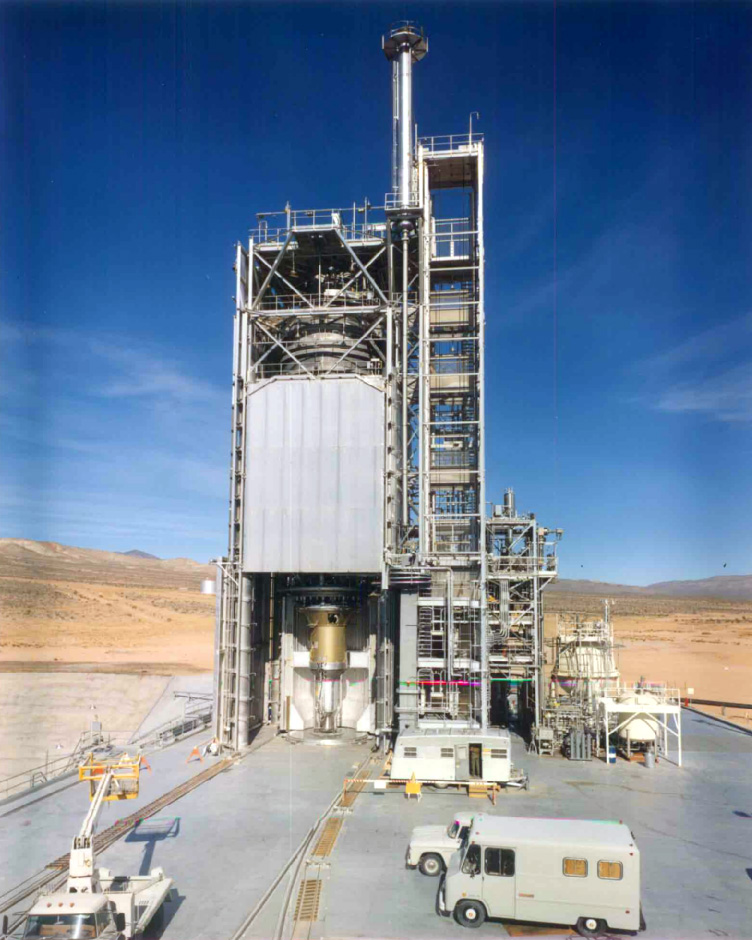
ETS-1 at Test Cell C

The next test was of NERVA A3 on 23 April 1965. This test was intended to verify that the engine could be run and restarted at full power. The engine was operated for eight minutes, three and a half of them at full power, before the instruments indicated that too much hydrogen was going into the engine. A scram was ordered, but a coolant line became clogged. Power increased to 1,165 MW before the line unclogged, and the engine shut down gracefully. There were fears for the integrity of the tie rods that held the fuel clusters together. They were supposed to operate at 473 K (200 °C), with a maximum of 651 K (378 °C). The sensors recorded that the tie rods had reached 1,095 K (822 °C), which was the maximum that the sensors could record. Laboratory tests later confirmed that the rods might have reached 1,370 K (1,100 °C). There was also what appeared to be a hole in the nozzle, but this turned out to be soot. The robust engine was undamaged, so the test continued, and the engine was run for thirteen minutes at 1,072 MW. Once again, the test time was limited only by the available hydrogen.

Testing of NASA's NERVA NRX/EST (Engine System Test) commenced on 3 February 1966. The objectives were:

1. Demonstrate the feasibility of starting and restarting the engine without an external power source.
2. Evaluate the control system characteristics (stability and control mode) during startup, shutdown, cooldown and restart for a variety of initial conditions.
3. Investigate the system stability over a broad operating range.
4. Investigate the endurance capability of the engine components, especially the reactor, during transient and steady-state operation with multiple restarts.

The NRX/EST was run at intermediate power levels on 3 and 11 February, with a full power (1,055 MW) test on 3 March, followed by engine duration tests on 16 and 25 March. The engine was started eleven times. All test objectives were successfully accomplished, and NRX/EST operated for a total of nearly two hours, including 28 minutes at full power. It exceeded the operating time of previous Kiwi reactors by nearly a factor of two.

The next objective was to run the reactors continuously for an extended length of time. The NRX A5 was started up on 8 June 1966, and run at full power for fifteen and a half minutes. During cooldown, a bird landed on the nozzle and was asphyxiated by the nitrogen or helium gas, dropping onto the core. It was feared that it might block the propellant lines or create uneven heating before being blown out again when the engine was restarted, so the Westinghouse engineers rigged a television camera and a vacuum hose, and were able to remove the bird while safely behind a concrete wall. The engine was restarted on 23 June and run at full power for another fourteen and a half minutes. Although there was severe corrosion, resulting in about $2.20 of reactivity lost, the engine could still have been restarted, but the engineers wanted to examine the core.

An hour was now set as the goal for the NRX A6 test. This was beyond the capacity of Test Cell A, so testing now moved to Test Cell C with its giant dewars. NRX A5 was therefore the last test to use Test Cell A. The reactor was started on 7 December 1966, but a shutdown was ordered 75 seconds into the test due to a faulty electrical component. This was followed by a postponement due to inclement weather. NRX A6 was started up again on 15 December. It ran at full power (1,125 MW) with a chamber temperature of over 2,270 K (2,000 °C) and pressure of 4,089 kilopascals (593.1 psi), and a flow rate of 32.7 kilograms per second (4,330 lb/min). It took 75.3 hours to cool the reactor with liquid nitrogen. On examination, it was found that the beryllium reflector had cracked due to thermal stress. The test caused the abandonment of plans to build a more powerful NERVA II engine. If more thrust was required, a NERVA I engine could be run longer, or it could be clustered.

=== NERVA XE ===
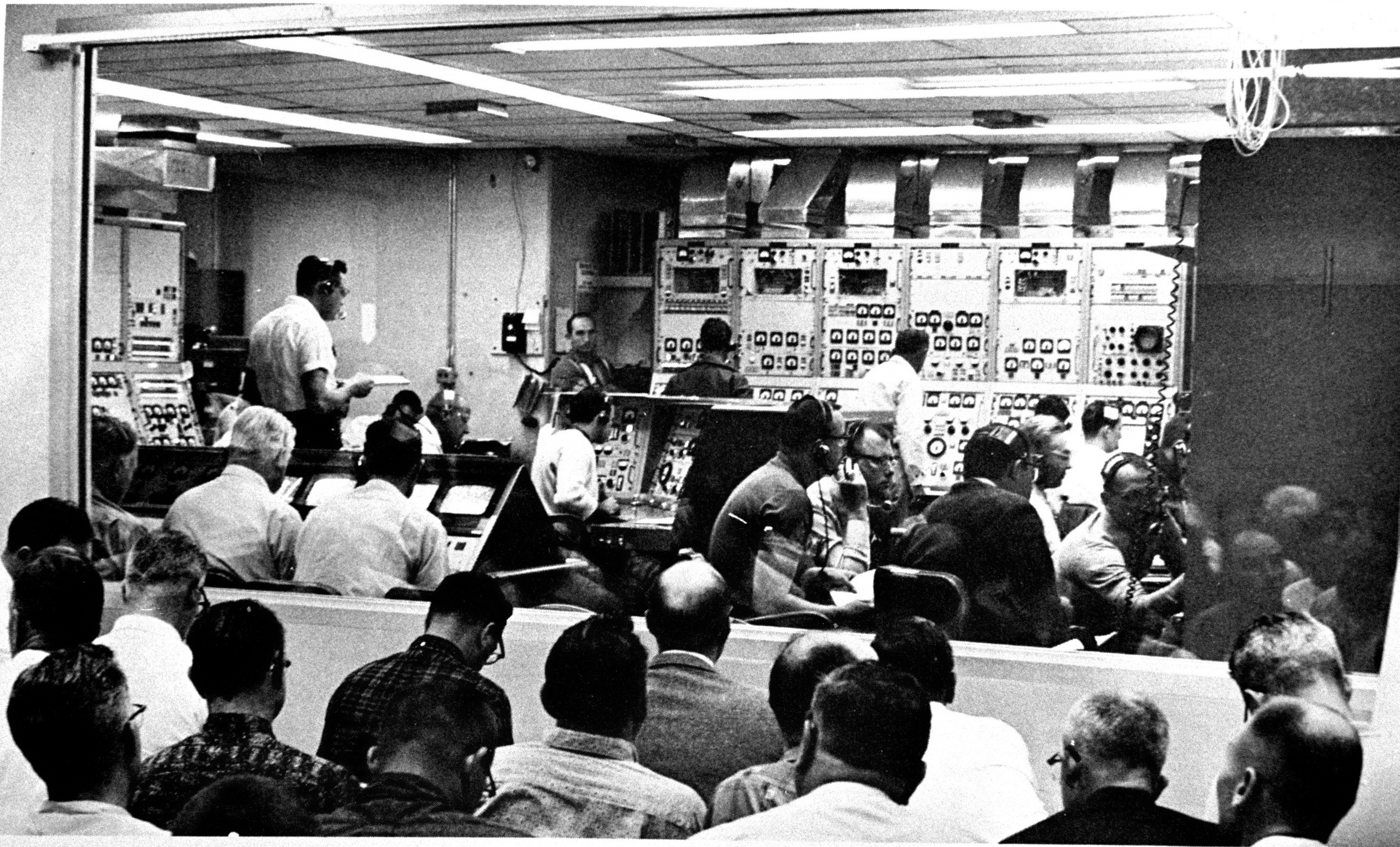
NERVA control room

With the success of the A6 test, SNPO cancelled planned follow-on tests A7 and A8 and concentrated on completing ETS-1. All previous tests had the engine firing upwards; ETS-1 would permit an engine to be reoriented to fire downward into a reduced-pressure compartment to partly simulate firing in the vacuum of space. The test stand provided a reduced atmospheric pressure of about 6.9 kilopascals (1.00 psi) – equivalent to being at an altitude of 60,000 feet (18,000 m). This was done by injecting water into the exhaust, which created superheated steam that surged out at high speeds, creating a vacuum.

ETS-1 took longer for Aerojet to complete than expected, partly due to shrinking budgets, but also because of technical challenges. It was built from pure aluminum, which did not become radioactive when irradiated by neutrons, and there was a water spray to keep it cool. Rubber gaskets were a problem, as they tended to turn into goo in a radioactive environment; metal ones had to be used. The most challenging part was the exhaust ducts, which were required to handle much higher temperatures than their chemical rocket counterparts. The steel work was carried out by Allegheny Technologies, and the Air Preheater Company fabricated the pipes. The work required 54,000 kilograms (120,000 lb) of steel, 3,900 kilograms (8,700 lb) of welding wire and 10.5 kilometers (6.5 mi) of welds. During a test the 234 tubes would have to carry up to 11,000,000 litres (3,000,000 US gal) of water. To save money on cabling, Aerojet moved the control room to a bunker 240 meters (800 ft) away.

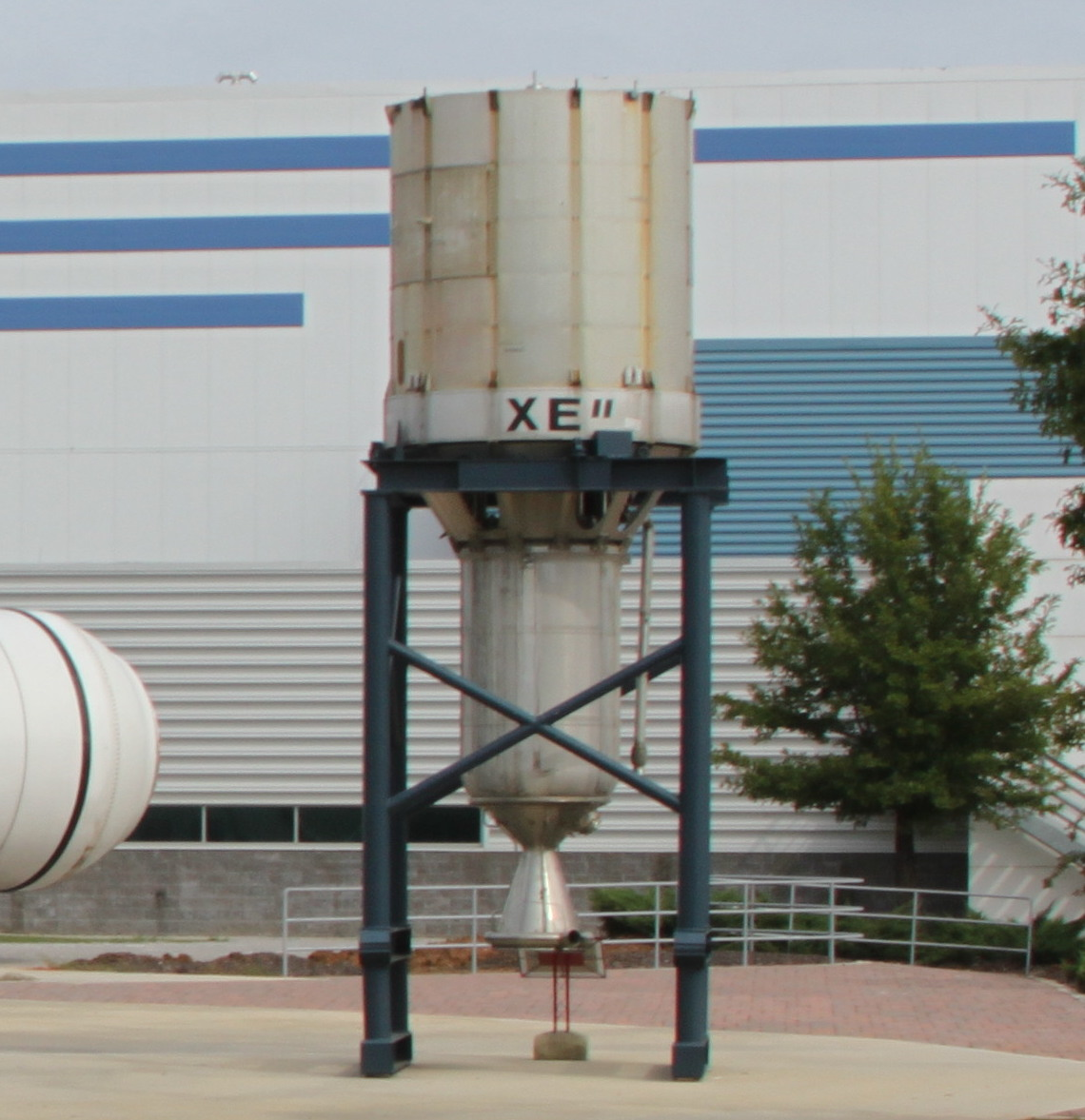
NERVA XE at the Marshall Space Flight Center

The second NERVA engine, the NERVA XE, was designed to come as close as possible to a complete flight system, even to the point of using a flight-design turbopump. To save time and money, components that would not affect the engine's performance were selected from what was available at Jackass Flats. A radiation shield was added to protect external components. The test objectives included testing the use of ETS-1 at Jackass Flats for flight engine qualification and acceptance. Total run time was 115 minutes, including 28 starts. NASA and SNPO felt that the test "confirmed that a nuclear rocket engine was suitable for space flight application and was able to operate at a specific impulse twice that of chemical rocket system[s]." The engine was deemed adequate for Mars missions being planned by NASA. The facility was also deemed adequate for flight qualification and acceptance of rocket engines from the two contractors.

The final test of the series was XE Prime. This engine was 6.9 meters (23 ft) long, 2.59 meters (8 ft 6 in) in diameter, and weighed approximately 18,144 kilograms (40,001 lb). It was designed to produce a nominal thrust of 246,663 newtons (55,452 lb_{f}) with a specific impulse of 710 seconds (7.0 km/s). When the reactor was operating at full power, about 1,140 MW, the chamber temperature was 2,272 K (2,000 °C), chamber pressure was 3,861 kilopascals (560.0 psi), and the flow rate was 35.8 kilograms per second (4,740 lb/min), of which 0.4 kilograms per second (53 lb/min) was diverted into the cooldown system. A series of experiments were carried out between 4 December 1968 and 11 September 1969, during which the reactor was started 24 times, and ran at full power for 1,680 seconds.

=== Reactor and engine test summary ===
Reactor	Test date	Starts	Average full power (MW)	Time at full power (s)	Propellant temperature (chamber) (K)	Propellant temperature (exit) (K)	Chamber pressure (kPa)	Flow rate (kg/s)	Vacuum specific impulse (s)
NERVA A2	September 1964	2	1096	40	2119	2229	4006	34.3	811
NERVA A3	April 1965	3	1093	990	2189	>2400	3930	33.3	>841
NRX EST	February 1966	11	1144	830	2292	>2400	4047	39.3	>841
NRX A5	June 1966	2	1120	580	2287	>2400	4047	32.6	>841
NRX A6	November 1967	2	1199	3623	2406	2558	4151	32.7	869
XE PRIME	March 1969	28	1137	1680	2267	>2400	3806	32.8	>841

== Cancellation ==
At the time of the NERVA NRX/EST test, NASA's plans for NERVA included a visit to Mars by 1978, a permanent lunar base by 1981, and deep space probes to Jupiter, Saturn, and the outer planets. NERVA rockets would be used for nuclear "tugs" designed to take payloads from low Earth orbit (LEO) to higher orbits as a component of the later-named Space Transportation System, resupply several space stations in orbit around the Earth and Moon, and support a permanent lunar base. The NERVA rocket could also be a nuclear-powered upper stage for the Saturn rocket, which would allow the upgraded Saturn to launch payloads of up to 150,000 kg (340,000 lb) to LEO.

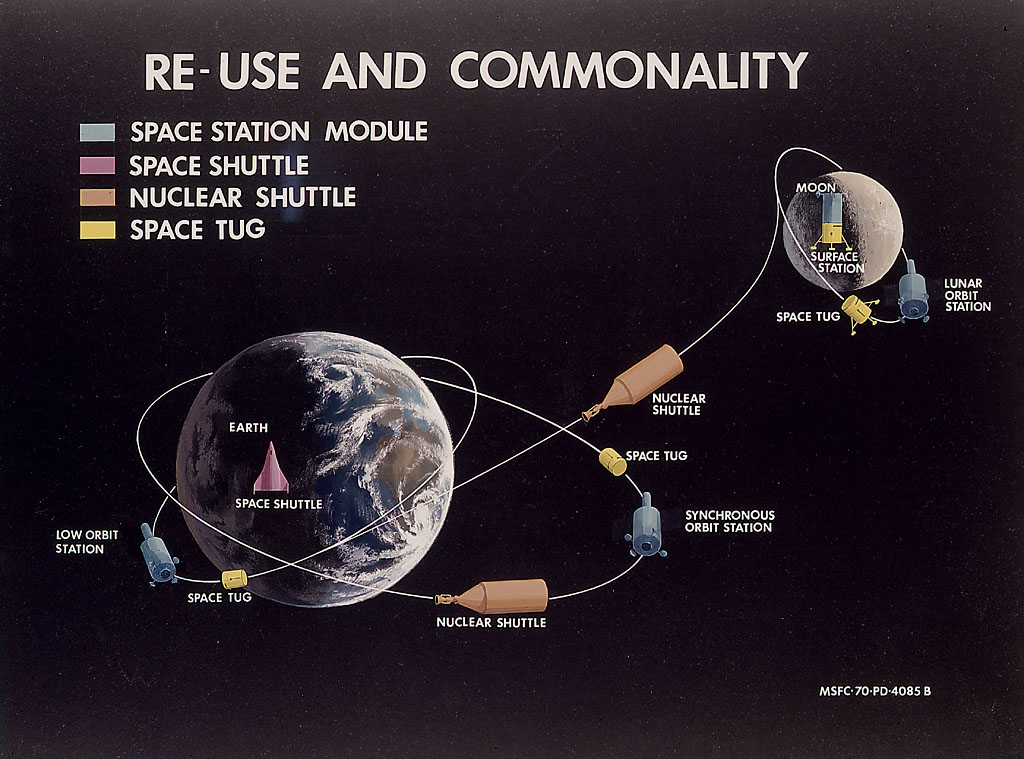
1970 artist's concept illustrates the use of the Space Shuttle, Nuclear Shuttle, and Space Tug in NASA's Integrated Program.

Defending NERVA from its critics like Hornig, the chairman of the President's Science Advisory Committee (PSAC), required a series of bureaucratic and political battles as the rising cost of the Vietnam War put pressure on budgets. Congress defunded NERVA II in the 1967 budget, but President Johnson needed Senator Anderson's support for his Medicare legislation, so on 7 February 1967 he provided the money for NERVA II from his own contingency fund. Klein, who had succeeded Finger as head of the SNPO in 1967, faced two hours of questioning on NERVA II before the House Committee on Science and Astronautics. In the end, the committee cut NASA's budget. Defunding NERVA II saved $400 million, mainly in new facilities that would be required to test it. This time AEC and NASA acquiesced, because the NRX A6 test had demonstrated that NERVA I could perform the missions expected of NERVA II. The following year, Webb attempted to take money from NERVA I to pay for NASA overhead after Congress cut NASA's budget to $3.8 billion. Johnson restored NERVA I's funding, but not NASA's.

NERVA had plenty of proposed missions. NASA considered using Saturn V and NERVA on a "Grand Tour" of the Solar System. A rare alignment of the planets that occurs every 174 years occurred between 1976 and 1980, allowing a spacecraft to visit Jupiter, Saturn, Uranus and Neptune. With NERVA, that spacecraft could weigh up to 24,000 kilograms (52,000 lb). This was assuming NERVA had a specific impulse of only 825 seconds (8.09 km/s); 900 seconds (8.8 km/s) was more likely, and with that it could place a 77,000-kilogram (170,000 lb) space station the size of Skylab into orbit around the Moon. Repeat trips to the Moon could be made with NERVA powering a nuclear shuttle. There was also of course the mission to Mars, which Klein diplomatically avoided mentioning, knowing that, even in the wake of the Apollo 11 Moon landing, the idea was unpopular with Congress and the general public.

Project Rover and NERVA budgets ($ millions)
Program element	AEC	NASA
Kiwi	21.9	136.9
NERVA	334.4	346.5
RIFT		19.1
Research and technology	200.7	138.7
NRDS operations	75.3	19.9
Equipment obligations	43.4	
Facilities	82.8	30.9
Total	873.5	567.7

Richard Nixon replaced Johnson as president on 20 January 1969, and cost cutting became the order of the day. NASA program funding was somewhat reduced by Congress for the federal budget, shutting down the Saturn V production line. On 4 January 1970, NASA Administrator Thomas O. Paine announced the cancellation of Apollo 20 to make its Saturn V available to launch Skylab. The cancellation of Apollo 18 and 19 followed in September 1970. But NERVA remained; Klein endorsed a plan whereby the Space Shuttle would lift a NERVA engine into orbit, then later return with fuel and a payload. This could be repeated, as NERVA was restartable. NERVA now needed the shuttle, but the shuttle did not need NERVA. NERVA still had the steadfast support of Anderson and Cannon in the Senate, but Anderson was aging and tiring, and now delegated many of his duties to Cannon. NERVA received $88 million in fiscal year (FY) 1970 and $85 million in FY 1971, funds coming jointly from NASA and the AEC.

In December 1970, the Office of Management and Budget recommended the cancellation of NERVA and Skylab, but Nixon was reluctant to do so, as their cancellation could cost up to 20,000 jobs, mostly in California, a state that Nixon felt he needed to carry in the 1972 election. He decided to keep it alive at a low funding level, and cancel Apollo 17 instead. The concern about Apollo 17 was about the political fallout if it failed rather than the cost, and this was ultimately addressed by postponing it to December 1972, after the election. When Nixon tried to kill NERVA in 1971, Senator Anderson and Senator Margaret Chase Smith instead killed Nixon's pet project, the Boeing 2707 supersonic transport (SST). This was a stunning defeat for the president. In the budget for FY 1972, funding for the shuttle was cut, but NERVA and Apollo 17 survived. Although NERVA's budget request was only $17.4 million, Congress allocated $69 million; Nixon only spent $29 million of it. (Note: With the Congressional Budget and Impoundment Control Act of 1974, Congress would strip the president of this ability.)

Congress supported NERVA again in 1972. A bipartisan coalition headed by Smith and Cannon appropriated $100 million for the small NERVA engine that would fit inside the shuttle's cargo bay that was estimated to cost about $250 million over a decade. They added a stipulation that there would be no more reprogramming NERVA funds to pay for other NASA activities. The Nixon administration decided to cancel NERVA anyway. On 5 January 1973, NASA announced that NERVA was terminated. Staff at LASL and SNPO were stunned; the project to build a small NERVA had been proceeding well. Layoffs began immediately, and the SNPO was abolished in June. After 17 years of research and development, Projects Nova and NERVA had spent about $1.4 billion, but NERVA had never flown.

== Post-NERVA research ==
In 1983, the Strategic Defense Initiative ("Star Wars") identified missions that could benefit from rockets that are more powerful than chemical rockets, and some that could only be undertaken by more powerful rockets. A nuclear propulsion project, SP-100, was created in February 1983 with the aim of developing a 100 KW nuclear rocket system. The concept incorporated a particle/pebble-bed reactor, a concept developed by James R. Powell at the Brookhaven National Laboratory, which promised a specific impulse of up to 1,000 seconds (9.8 km/s) and a thrust to weight ratio of between 25 and 35 for thrust levels greater than 89,000 newtons (20,000 lbf).

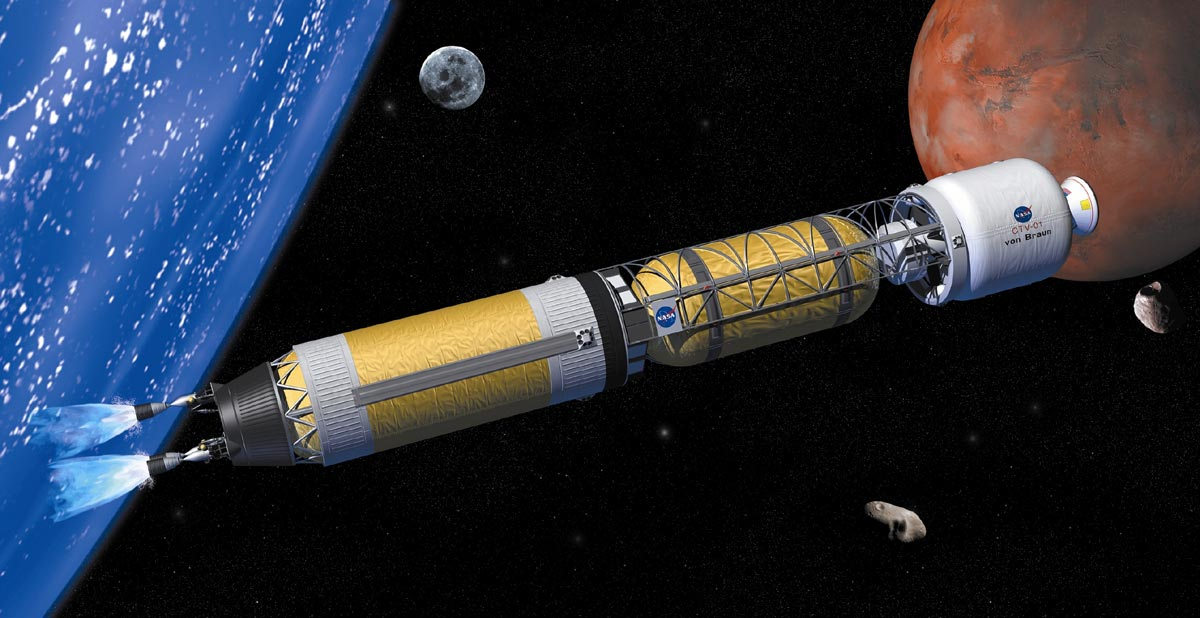
Artist's impression of a bimodal nuclear thermal rocket

From 1987 to 1991 this was funded as a secret project codenamed Project Timber Wind, which spent $139 million. The proposed rocket project was transferred to the Space Nuclear Thermal Propulsion (SNTP) program at the Air Force Phillips Laboratory in October 1991. NASA conducted studies as part of its 1992 Space Exploration Initiative (SEI) but felt that SNTP offered insufficient improvement over NERVA, and was not required by any SEI missions. The SNTP program was terminated in January 1994, after $200 million was spent.

In 2013, an engine for interplanetary travel from Earth orbit to Mars orbit and back was studied at the MSFC with a focus on nuclear thermal rocket (NTR) engines. Since NTRs are at least twice as efficient as the most advanced chemical engines, they allow quicker transfer times and increased cargo capacity. The shorter flight duration, estimated at 3–4 months with NTR engines, compared to 8–9 months using chemical engines, would reduce crew exposure to potentially harmful and difficult to shield cosmic rays. NTR engines were selected in the Mars Design Reference Architecture (DRA).

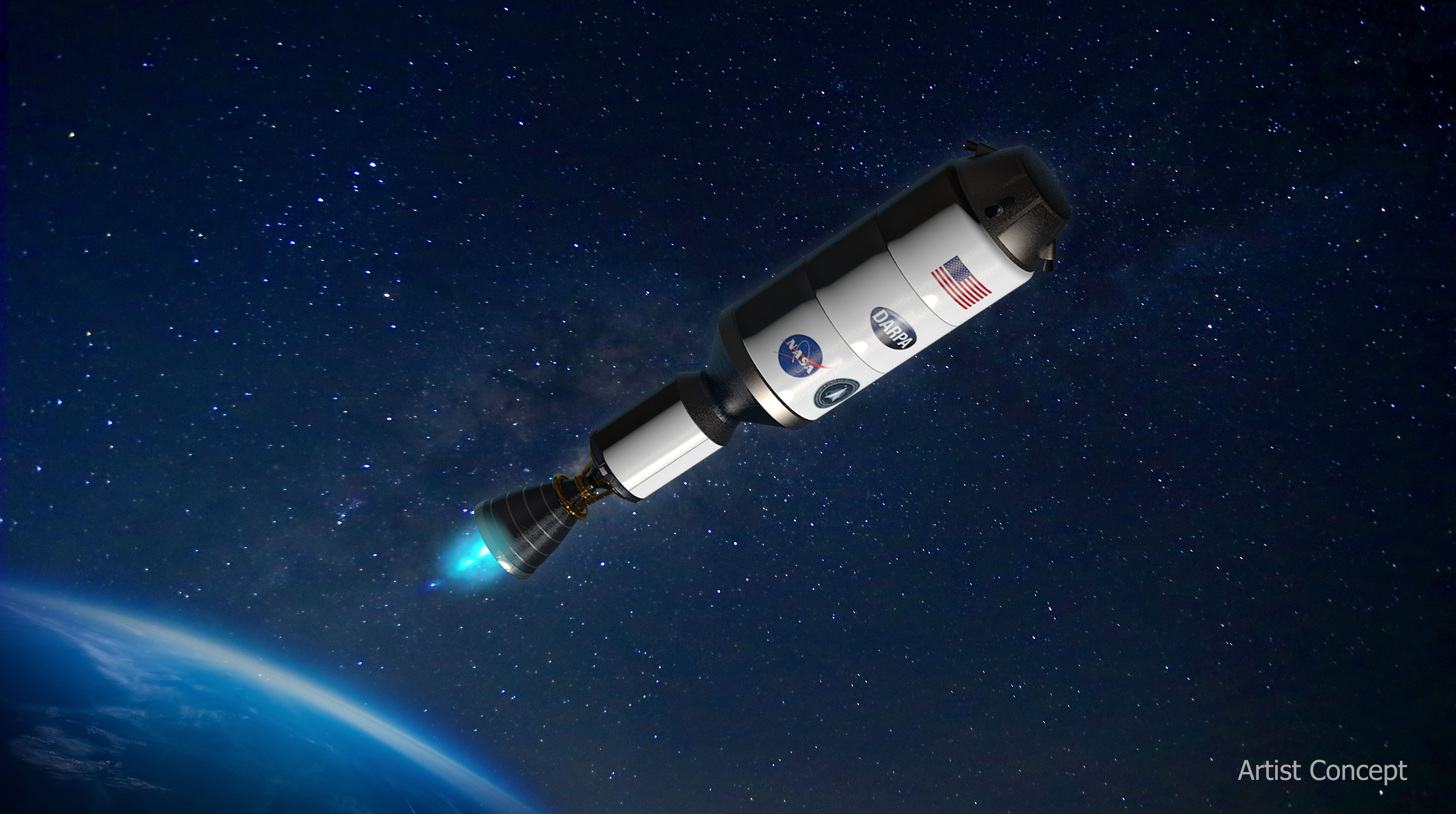
Artist's concept of the Demonstration Rocket for Agile Cislunar Operations (DRACO) spacecraft

Congress approved $125 million in funding for the development of nuclear thermal propulsion rockets on 22 May 2019. On 19 October 2020, the Seattle-based firm Ultra Safe Nuclear Technologies delivered a NTR design concept to NASA employing high-assay low-enriched uranium (HALEU) ZrC-encapsulated fuel particles as part of a NASA-sponsored NTR study managed by Analytical Mechanics Associates (AMA). In January 2023, NASA and the Defense Advanced Research Projects Agency (DARPA) announced that they would collaborate on the development of a nuclear thermal rocket engine that would be tested in space to develop nuclear propulsion capability for use in crewed NASA missions to Mars. In 2023, DARPA announced that the Demonstration Rocket for Agile Cislunar Operations (DRACO) reactor and fuel would be supplied by BWXT. The project was canceled in 2025.

== See also ==
- RD-0410, a Soviet nuclear thermal rocket engine
- SNAP-10A, an experimental nuclear reactor launched into space in 1965
- Project Prometheus, NASA nuclear generation of electric power 2003–2005
