= Boron aluminum titanium hydride =

Boron Aluminum Titanium Hydride (BATH) was developed as a radiation shielding material in the NERVA project for space nuclear thermal propulsion applications. It is a metal matrix composite, consisting of particles of boron carbide (29.5–30.8 wt%) and titanium hydride (4.7–5.1 wt%) embedded in an aluminium matrix (64.1 wt%).
