= Solar Total Energy Project =

Solar thermal cogeneration project in Georgia, USA

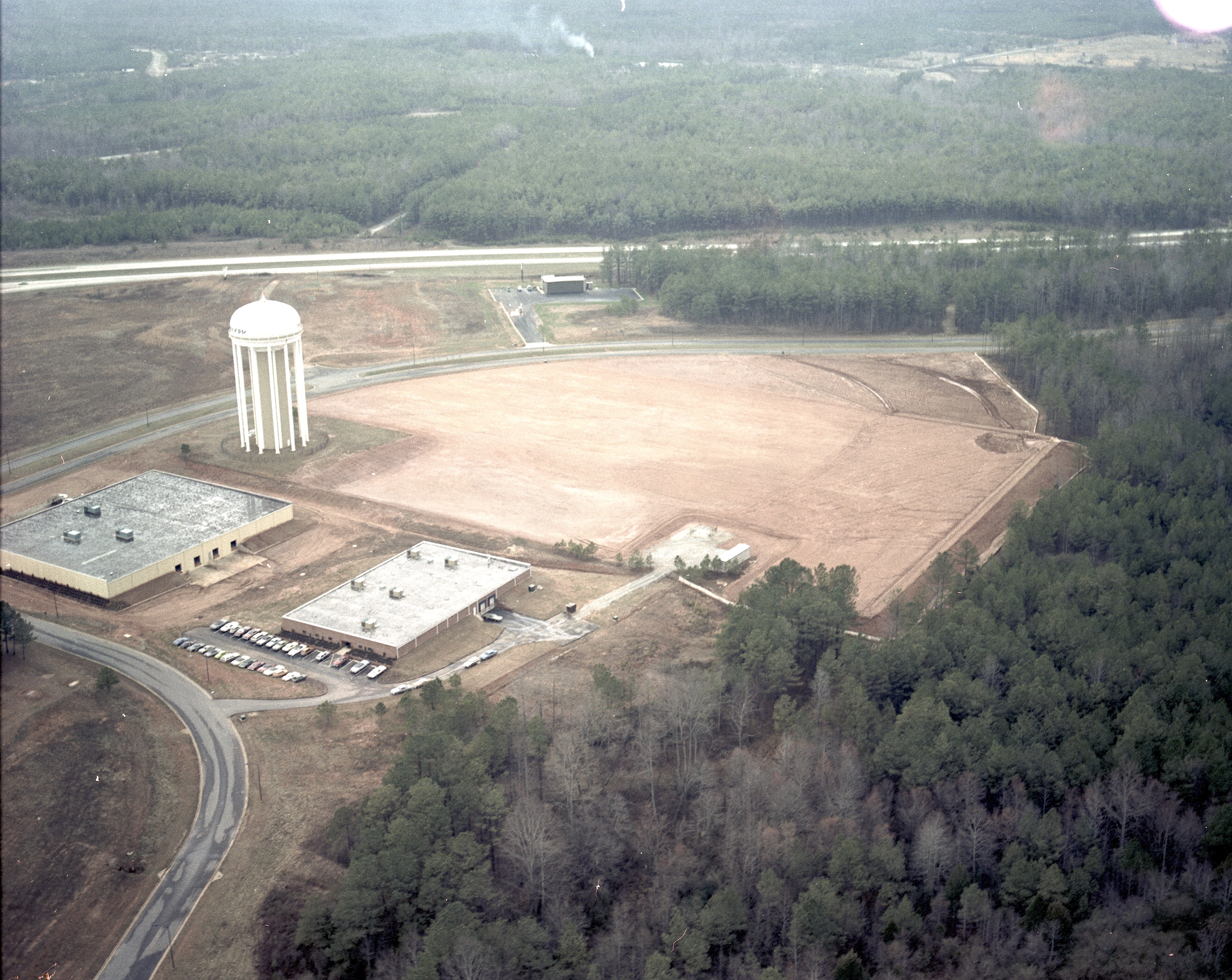
Solar Total Energy Project Shenandoah site in 1979

The Solar Total Energy Project (STEP) was the world's first and largest solar thermal cogeneration project having an industrial application. Built and operated during the 1980s in Coweta County, Georgia, STEP used solar energy to provide electricity and process heat to a manufacturing facility.

Developed as part of the National Solar Thermal Energy Program, which was instituted after the oil crises of the 1970s, STEP was jointly financed by the United States Department of Energy and Georgia Power to advance development of nonconventional renewable energy technology. The objective was to design, construct, operate and evaluate a solar thermal energy system that could provide electrical power, process steam and absorption air conditioning to an adjacent knitwear factory.

== Project history ==
In 1977, DoE selected a joint proposal by Georgia Power and the Westinghouse Advanced Energy Systems Division from a field of 16 competitors from 14 states for STEP's site and commercial application. Design work was completed between 1978 and 1980 under DoE sponsorship (with Georgia Power cost-sharing support) through the construction and test operations phases. The project was formally dedicated and began test operations in May 1982. Georgia Power assumed full responsibility for STEP's commercial operation in 1984 and continued the project beyond 1987.

The project was conceived by Edward J. Ney, a Westinghouse energy physicist who later became a nationally recognized expert on solar energy systems. Ney was the Project Integrator while with Westinghouse, later joining Georgia Power as Manager of Solar Operations and STEP Project Manager. He brought the involved parties into a joint-venture agreement and subsequently oversaw design, construction, test operations, commercial operations, and eventual decommissioning and disassembly of the Project.

== Site ==
The site for the five-plus acre project was Solar Circle, along Amlajack Boulevard, in a commercial park within the former planned community of Shenandoah, Georgia, now part of the city of Newnan.

While STEP was shut down and dismantled by 1991, the site of the collector field is still visible from the air, albeit with mature pine trees growing through the crumbling pavement within the still-fenced enclosure. The overall site includes an education center at 7 Solar Circle, between the former collector field and Amlajack Blvd. The facility, known as the University of West Georgia Newnan Center, accommodates classes in a range of curricula.

== Industrial application ==
The industrial application for the project was a knitwear factory operated by Bleyle of America Inc. STEP provided a large part of the electricity for the facility, displacing fossil fuels normally used to generate power to run the factory. STEP also provided process heat for absorption air conditioning within the building, as well as steam (downstream from the turbine) for pressing the knitwear products.

The building was designed with a series of features for energy efficiency, including reduced height to minimize wall area and interior volume, a 4-foot (1.2 m) insulating earthen berm around the building, north-south orientation, heavily insulated roof and walls, high-efficiency fluorescent lighting, energy-efficient production equipment, and an air conditioning system with an economizer cycle. According to Georgia Power, which monitored the facility's energy requirements as part of the STEP design process, energy conserving features alone reduced the factory's energy consumption by 46 percent.

STEP was designed according to electrical, air conditioning and process steam loads already established by the knitwear factory, which began operations during STEP's design phase. These parameters, which represent the facility's relatively constant peak load profile, were used for system design.
