= John Wistar Simpson =

- Born: September 25, 1914; Glenn Springs, South Carolina
- Died: January 4, 2007 (aged 92); Hilton Head
- Education: University of Pittsburgh
- Known for: contributions to nuclear energy
- Awards: IEEE Edison Medal (1971); Newcomen Medal

John Wistar Simpson (25 September 1914 – January 4, 2007) was an electrical engineer, who made significant contributions to the development of the nuclear energy.

== Biography ==
He was born in 1914 in Glenn Springs, South Carolina. He joined Westinghouse in 1937 and, earned a master's degree in electrical engineering from the University of Pittsburgh in 1941. He was a close associate of Adm. Hyman G. Rickover, known as the father of the nuclear Navy.

Simpson took a two-year leave of absence from Westinghouse in 1946 to work at Oak Ridge National Laboratory where they applied nuclear energy to the generation of power. When he returned to Westinghouse he became responsible for research and development of nuclear energy generation at the Bettis Atomic Power Laboratory. He was deeply involved in the design and construction of the first submarine atomic power plant in the USS Nautilus (SSN-571). In the late 1950s, he organized the Westinghouse Astronuclear Laboratory, with a federal contract to build a nuclear thermal rocket. It was successfully tested, but sidelined by NASA’s Gemini program.

He was elected to the National Academy of Engineering in April, 1966. He was awarded the IEEE Edison Medal in 1971 "For sustained contributions to society through the development and engineering design of nuclear power systems." Simpson received in 1982 the Walter H. Zinn Award from the American Nuclear Society. He also was a Fellow of the IEEE, and a member of the American Society of Mechanical Engineers, the Society of Naval Architects and Marine Engineering and the Atomic Industrial Forum. Simpson was the author of several nonfiction books including Nuclear Power from Underseas to Outer Space.

He died on January 4, 2007, in Hilton Head.
