= Phillips Laboratory =

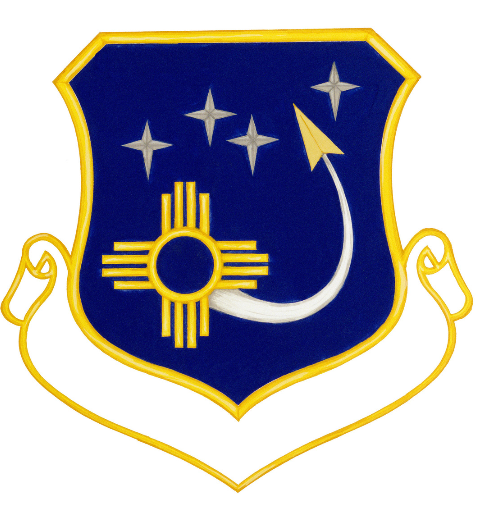
- Emblem of the Phillips Laboratory
- Active: 1990–October 1997
- Country: United States
- Branch: Air Force
- Role: Research and development
- Part of: Air Force Systems Command (1990-1992); Air Force Materiel Command (1992-1997)
- Garrison/HQ: Kirtland AFB, New Mexico

Phillips Laboratory was a research and development organization operated by the United States Air Force Materiel Command. In 1997, the Laboratory was merged into the Air Force Research Laboratory as the Space Vehicles and Directed Energy Directorates. It was located at Kirtland Air Force Base in Albuquerque, New Mexico.

The Laboratory was named after Gen Samuel C. Phillips, a former director of the Apollo Manned Lunar Landing Project.

== See also ==
- Phillips Research Site
- Starfire Optical Range (SOR)
