= BREN Tower =

Coordinates: 36°46′50.23″N 116°14′36.9″W

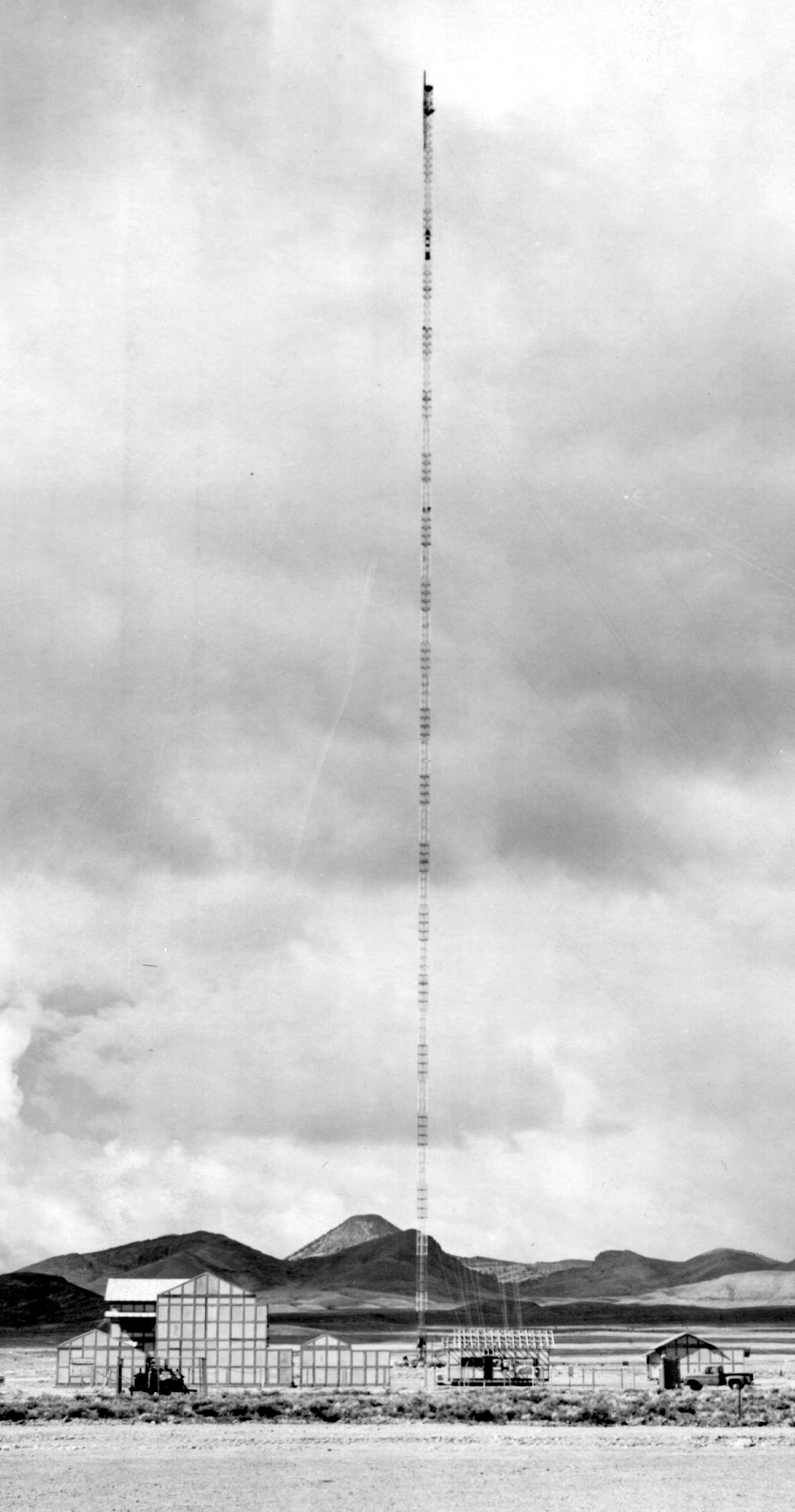
BREN Tower

BREN Tower was a guyed steel framework mast, 1,527 ft (465 m) high, on the Nevada Test Site in Nevada, USA. "BREN" stands for "Bare Reactor Experiment, Nevada." The structure was owned by the Department of Energy and maintained by National Security Technologies. Access to the tower area had been closed since July 2006. No reason for the closure has been given. As part of the Nevada Test Site, it was also located in restricted airspace (R-4808N).

== History ==
Built by the Dresser-Ideco Company for the U.S. Atomic Energy Commission, it was first erected in 1962 in the atomic bomb test area at Yucca Flat, where it was used for an experiment intended to improve understanding the effects of radiation in the atomic bombing of Hiroshima. A bare (unshielded) nuclear reactor on a hoist car could be moved to different heights on the tower; Japanese-type houses were built near the base of the tower and were bombarded with various intensities of radiation.

In 1966, after the 1963 Nuclear Test Ban Treaty banned open-air nuclear testing, the tower was dismantled and despite its immense size moved from its original location to Jackass Flats in Area 25 of the Nevada Test Site, where it was used for Operation HENRE (High Energy Neutron Reactions Experiment), a series of radiation measurement experiments using a small linear accelerator to provide neutrons.

== Specifications ==
Constructed of fifty-one 30 ft (9.1 m) sections of high tensile steel, the structure was higher than the 1,472 ft (449 m) Empire State Building. It was supported by 5.5 mi (8.9 km) of guy wires designed to withstand winds exceeding 120 mph (190 km/h). The tower was equipped with an outside hoist to lift scientific equipment, and a two-person elevator inside the tower moved at 100 ft (30 m) per minute. The tower weighed 345 tons (313 tonnes).

== Demolition ==
The structure was demolished on May 23, 2012. The National Nuclear Security Administration listed reasons for the removal as safety concerns for nearby workers, unreasonable costs to restore the structure to working condition and hazards to air traffic.

== See also ==
- List of tallest structures in the United States
- List of tallest structures
