= SNPO =

SNPO may refer to:

- People's Socialist Party of Montenegro
- Space Nuclear Propulsion Office
