= Milton Klein (engineer) =

American nuclear engineer (1924–2022)

- Born: January 13, 1924; St. Louis, Missouri, U.S.
- Died: March 2, 2022 (aged 98); San Francisco, California, U.S.
- Education: Washington University in St. Louis (BS, 1944); Harvard University (MBA, 1950)
- Occupation: Nuclear engineer
- Spouse: Francis Motto

Milton Klein (January 13, 1924 – March 2, 2022) was an American nuclear engineer who was the head of the United States nuclear rocket program. He helped establish and lead the Space Nuclear Propulsion Office, a liaison organization between NASA and the Atomic Energy Commission to coordinate efforts to create a nuclear thermal rocket.

== Biography ==
Milton Klein was born in St. Louis, Missouri, on January 13, 1924. As boy he enjoyed baseball; he played sandlot ball and attended baseball games for free as part of the Knothole Gang program. He was educated at public schools in University City, Missouri, and graduated from University City High School, where he was valedictorian. He entered Washington University in St. Louis, from which he graduated with a Bachelor of Science degree in chemical engineering in 1944. During World War II he served in the U.S. Navy as an electronics technicians mate.

Klein began working in the nuclear power field at the Argonne National Laboratory in 1946. He earned a Master of Business Administration degree from Harvard Business School in 1950, and that year joined the Atomic Energy Commission as a chemical engineer at its Chicago Operations Office. He rose to become its Assistant manager for Technical Operations, overseeing the development of nuclear reactors for nuclear power plants. He married Francis Motto. They had three children.

On August 29, 1960, NASA created the Space Nuclear Propulsion Office (SNPO) to oversee the joint NASA-AEC Project Rover, which aimed to develop a nuclear thermal rocket engine. Klein was appointed its deputy manager. Its staff were a combination of NASA and AEC employees whose responsibilities included "program and resource planning and evaluation, the justification and distribution of program resources, the definition and control of overall program requirements, monitoring and reporting of progress and problems to NASA and AEC management, and the preparation of testimony to Congress."

In 1967, Klein became manager of the SNPO, and director of AEC's Division of Space Nuclear Systems. In 1970, SNPO was renamed the Space Nuclear Systems Office, and enlarged to cover all space nuclear-related activities, which included NERVA (the Nuclear Engine for Rocket Vehicle Application) and the development of nuclear-powered generators that were used by the Apollo, Pioneer, Viking and Voyager programs. He was also a member of the review board that investigated the Apollo 13 accident. The SNSO was abolished in June 1972. For his services, he was awarded the NASA Exceptional Service Medal in 1972.

After leaving NASA, Klein joined the Federal Railroad Administration as its associate administrator for research, development and administration. He worked for the Mitre Corporation, as its associate technical director, responsible for directing its energy program, and was the director of Research, Development, and Technology Applications of the International Energy Agency in Paris. In 1980, he became vice president and head of the Office of Special Projects of the Electrical Power Research Institute (EPRI), the research and development arm of the United States electric utility industry, and moved to the San Francisco Bay area.

Klein died on March 2, 2022, at the age of 98.
