= Harold Finger =

American aeronautical nuclear engineer

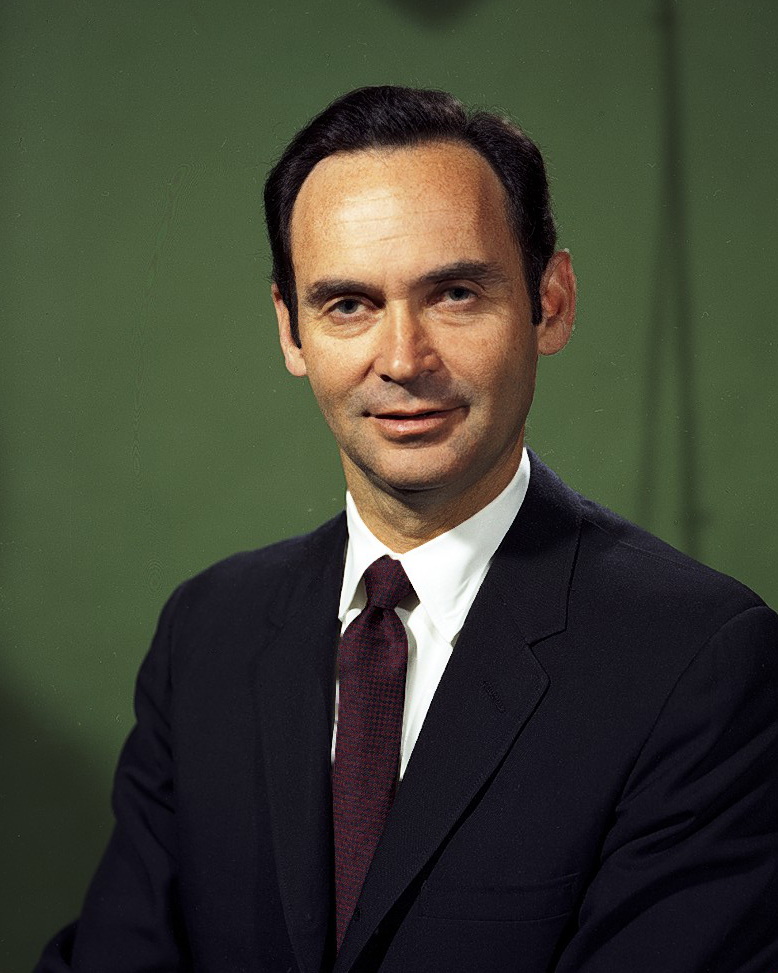
- Born: February 18, 1924 (age 102); Brooklyn, New York, U.S.
- Education: City College of New York (BS, 1944); Case Institute of Technology (MS, 1950)
- Occupations: Aeronautical and nuclear engineer

Harold Benjamin Finger (born February 18, 1924) is an American aeronautical nuclear engineer and the former head of the United States nuclear rocket program. He helped establish and lead the Space Nuclear Propulsion Office, a liaison organization between NASA and the Atomic Energy Commission to coordinate efforts to create a nuclear thermal rocket.

== Early life ==
Harold Benjamin Finger was born in Brooklyn, New York City, on February 18, 1924, the son of Beny Finger and his wife Anna née Perlmutter. He was called Harry by his family, friends and colleagues. His family moved to The Bronx when he was young. He attended Townsend Harris High School, from which he graduated in 1940. He then entered the City College of New York, from which he earned his Bachelor of Science degree in mechanical engineering in 1944.

== NACA ==
During World War II, he had a deferment until graduation, after which he expected to be drafted. He applied for a commission in the United States Navy and to the National Advisory Committee for Aeronautics (NACA) He was accepted into the latter, and for NACA at its Aircraft Engine Research Laboratory in Cleveland, Ohio. He was nominally as a member of the United States Army Air Corps enlisted reserve, in May 1944. His work initially involved testing German and Japanese aircraft engines, but he became involved in the development of the axial-flow compressor for jet engines.

The Aircraft Engine Research Laboratory was renamed the Lewis Flight Propulsion Laboratory after George W. Lewis on September 28, 1948. Finger married Arlene Karsh on June 11, 1949; they had three daughters. The following year, he was awarded a Master of Science degree in aeronautical engineering by the Case Institute of Technology. He became the head of the Axial Flow Compression Group at Lewis in 1952, and then Associate Chief of the Compressor Research Branch in 1954.

Abe Silverstein, the director of Lewis, believed that nuclear propulsion would be important in the future. In 1956, he established a nuclear training school at Lewis. There were twenty four students, a mixture of new recruits and experienced engineers. Finger was one of those chosen to attend. Six of the students elected to not continue with nuclear technology; the rest were formed into three groups. Finger headed one, which studied nuclear rocket propulsion. Silverstein abolished Lewis' compressor and turbine division in March 1957.

== NASA ==
On March 5, 1958, President Dwight D. Eisenhower announced his decision to create a new space agency, the National Aeronautics and Space Administration (NASA), which would absorb NACA. Silverstein moved to Washington, D.C., where he became the head of the Office of Space Flight Programs. Silverstein selected Finger to head NASA's nuclear projects. Responsibility for the nuclear thermal rocket project, Project Rover, was officially transferred from the United States Air Force (USAF) to NASA on October 1, 1958, the day NASA officially became operational and assumed responsibility for the US civilian space program.

On August 29, 1960, NASA created the Space Nuclear Propulsion Office (SNPO) to oversee Project Rover. Finger was appointed as its manager, with Milton Klein from the Atomic Energy Commission (AEC) as his deputy. Finger was also the director of nuclear systems in the NASA Office of Advanced Research and Technology. On March 5, 1961, he was appointed assistant director for nuclear applications. NASA SNPO Headquarters was co-located with AEC Headquarters in Germantown, Maryland. Its staff were a combination of NASA and AEC employees whose responsibilities included "program and resource planning and evaluation, the justification and distribution of program resources, the definition and control of overall program requirements, monitoring and reporting of progress and problems to NASA and AEC management, and the preparation of testimony to Congress."

In 1965, he also became director of the AEC's Space Nuclear Systems Division, so he was wearing three hats, at NASA, AEC and SNPO. He managed NASA's Nuclear Engine for Rocket Vehicle Application (NERVA) and as such was responsible for the nuclear rockets needed for deep space missions and for human missions including missions to Mars. He was also in charge of the Systems for Nuclear Auxiliary Power (SNAP) project that developed nuclear power sources. By 1999, twenty-six NASA missions (including seven Project Apollo missions to the Moon) had used nuclear generators to power scientific experiments on the Moon and in deep space.

He left those three positions in 1967 to become NASA’s Associate Administrator for Organization and Management. As such, he had responsibility all its administrative functions, along with its university programs and aerospace technology applications.

== Later life ==
Finger left NASA in March 1969, when he was appointed the first assistant secretary for research and technology in the U.S. Department of Housing and Urban Development. He created programs that combined housing assistance, housing technology, housing management and community development with urban planning. He left government at the end of 1972 to join the General Electric Company (GEC) as its new general manager for energy systems in Washington, D.C., and then as the manager of its electric utility engineering operation in Schenectady, New York. In 1980, he became its head of power systems strategic planning and development in Fairfield, Connecticut. He left GEC in January 1983 to become president and CEO of the U.S. Council for Energy Awareness, a non-profit energy analysis and public information organization involved mainly with electric utility matters, including nuclear energy systems. He retired in 1991, and became a consultant.

In 1970, Finger was named a fellow of the National Academy of Public Administration. He was also a fellow of the American Institute for Aeronautics and Astronautics, and a member of the American Nuclear Society. He was president of the NASA Alumni League, a member of the Smithsonian National Air and Space Society, and a lifetime trustee of the National Housing Conference.
