= Jackass Flats =

Alluvial basin in Nye County, Nevada, United States

Coordinates: 36°43′5″N 116°21′45″W

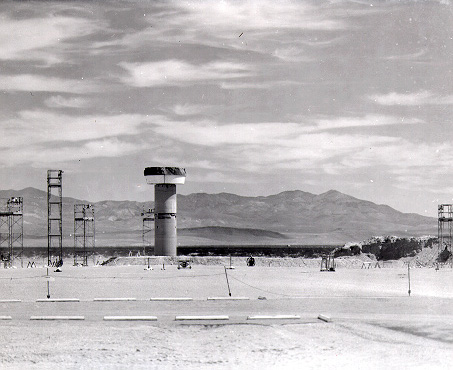
Simulated missile and canister test at Jackass Flats.

Jackass Flats is a shallow alluvial basin located in the southwest portion of the Nevada National Security Site in Nye County, Nevada, United States. The area lies east of Yucca Mountain, south of the Calico Hills and Shoshone Mountain and northwest of Skull Mountain. The valley drains to the southwest via the Tonopah and Fortymile washes into the Amargosa Valley across US Route 95 at the town of Amargosa Valley, Nevada. The "flat" covers an area of approximately 120 square miles (310 km^{2}) and ranges in elevation from about 2,800 ft (850 m) just north of US 95 to 4,000 ft (1,200 m) at the mountain bases to the north and east.

It is located mostly within Area 25 and extends into Area 14 and Area 26.

It was the test site of nuclear-powered rocket engines during project Project Rover and NERVA.
