= Area 25 (Nevada National Security Site) =

Part of the Nevada National Security Site, US

Coordinates: 36°48′N 116°18′W

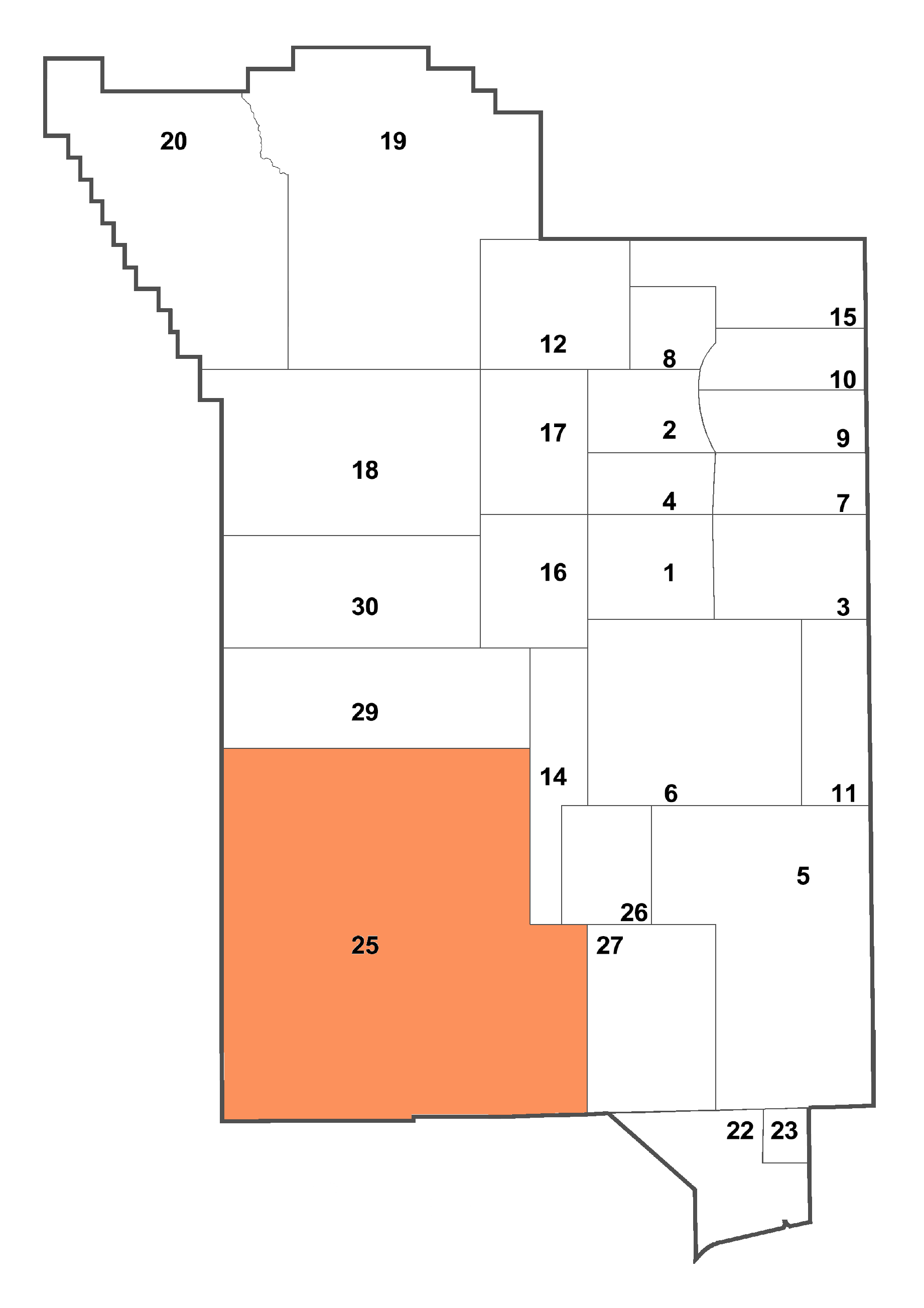
Area 25 within the Nevada Test Site

Area 25 is the largest named area in the Nevada National Security Site at 254 square miles (660 km^{2}), and has its own direct access from Route 95. Area 25 is commonly called "Jackass Flats" because it is composed primarily of a shallow alluvial basin by that name.

It was originally known as "Area 400", and was renamed "Area 25" circa 1970.

No nuclear explosions took place within Area 25.

== History ==
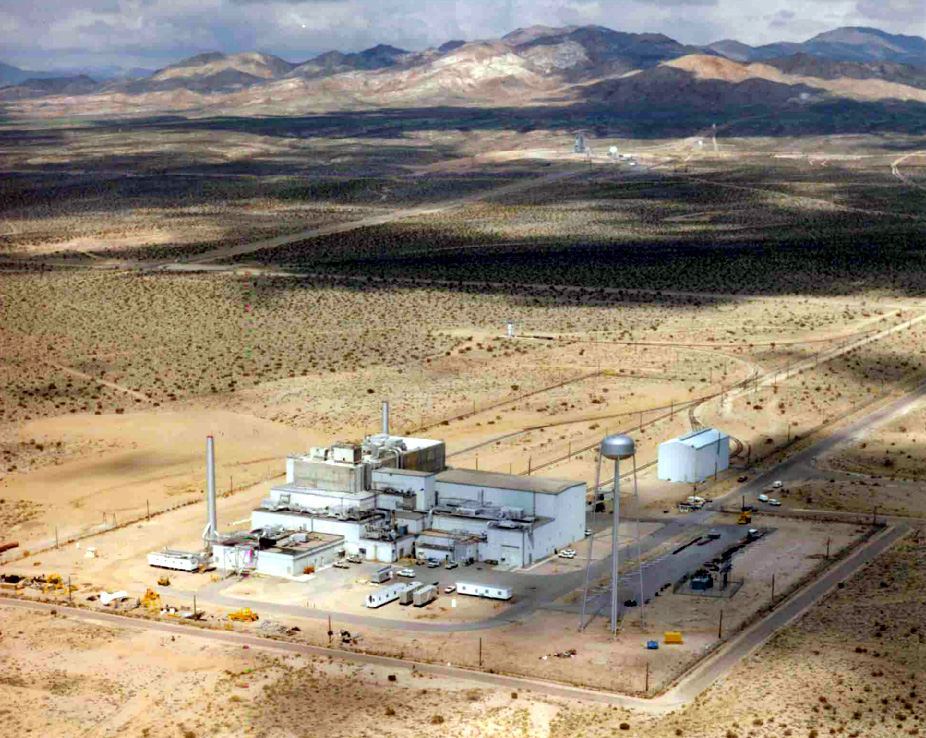
Engine Maintenance Assembly and Disassembly Facility

Area 25 is the site of the now decommissioned Nuclear Rocket Development Station (NRDS). It was built in support of Project Rover to test prototype nuclear rocket engines. The complex includes three test stands; the Engine Maintenance, Assembly, and Disassembly (E-MAD) facility; the Reactor Maintenance, Assembly, and Disassembly (R-MAD) facility; control point/technical operations complex; an administrative area; and, a radioactive material storage area. The R-MAD Facility was built to support the nuclear rocket program and was operational from 1959 through 1970. It was used to assemble reactor engines and to disassemble and study reactor parts and fuel elements after reactor tests. Project Rover was successful, but ultimately canceled. On 8 December 1962, President John F. Kennedy visited the NRDS.

Jackass Flats was proposed as a possible launch site for Project Orion, administered by General Atomics in the late 1950s.

The Rock Valley Study Area, at the southern boundary of Area 25, was used for studies of radiation in a desert ecosystem, starting in 1960.

High-level radioactive materials handling studies were carried out at the BREN Tower, recently demolished by implosion in Jackass Flats, where it was moved after 1963 for the High Energy Neutron Reaction Experiment (HENRE) series.

A "Treatability Test Facility" was established in Area 25 to study the physics of decontaminating soil containing plutonium or uranium.

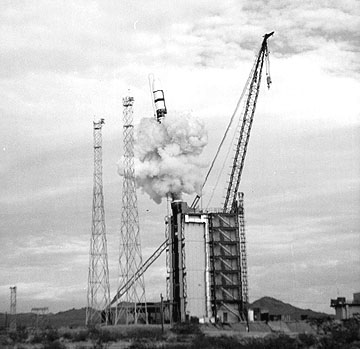
A canister launch system ejects a mock Peacekeeper missile from its silo in Area 25.

Area 25 was used in the early 1980s for Peacekeeper missile siting studies and canister ejection certification tests.

On April 26, 1984, Air Force Lieutenant General Robert M. Bond was conducting his second orientation test flight of a MiG-23 from the secret U.S. fleet of MiGs held at Area 51, and lost control over Area 25 . To explain the death and conceal the nuclear rocket testing that occurred at Area 25, information on the crash and the secret MiG testing program—with no mention of the prior use of the crash area—was leaked to Fred Hoffman, an AP military reporter.

Site characterization studies for the proposed Yucca Mountain nuclear waste repository were conducted at the site of earlier NRDS work. The Yucca Mountain site extends into Area 25, which was the proposed access point for delivery of radioactive waste to the repository.

== Later activities ==
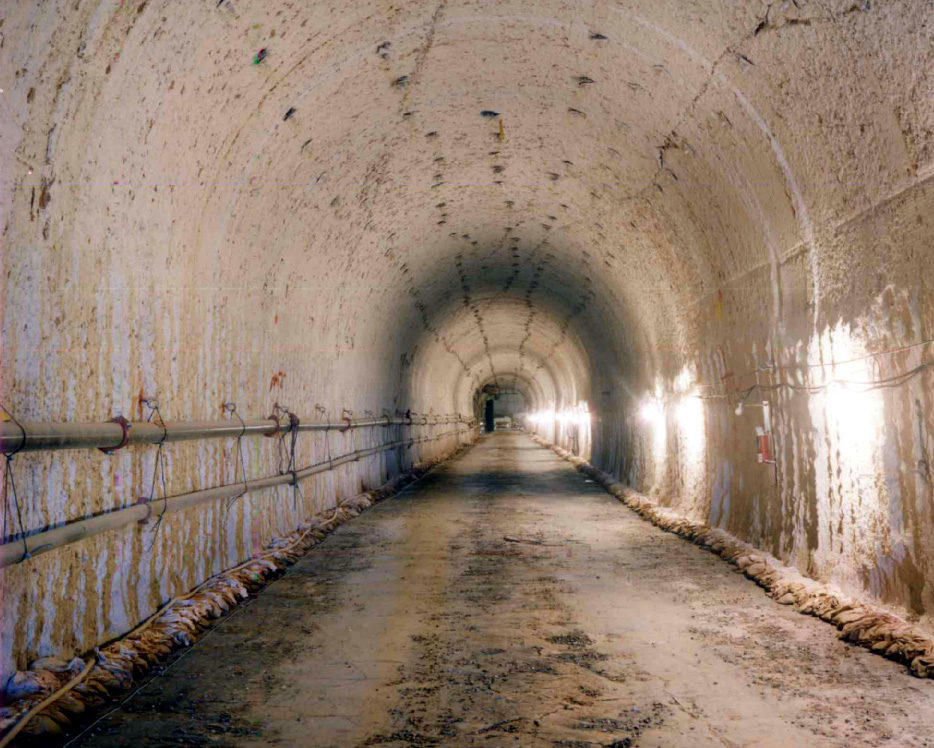
X-Tunnel in Area 25

Portions of Area 25 are used by the military for training exercises. The U.S. Army Ballistic Research Laboratory conducts open-air and X-tunnel tests using depleted uranium.

On July 8, 2010, Nevada US Senator Harry Reid, Energy Secretary Steven Chu and Secretary of the Interior Ken Salazar announced that a 25-square-mile (65 km^{2}) portion of the area was being reassigned as a development and test area for new solar technologies.

One of the Area 25 test stands, the Reactor Maintenance, Assembly, and Disassembly (R-MAD) facility, has been demolished. The non-radiologically contaminated portions of the facility were demolished in late 2005; demolition activities for the radiologically contaminated portions of the R-MAD Facility were initiated in October 2009 and completed on July 15, 2010.
