= Cryogenic storage dewar =

Vacuum insulated container

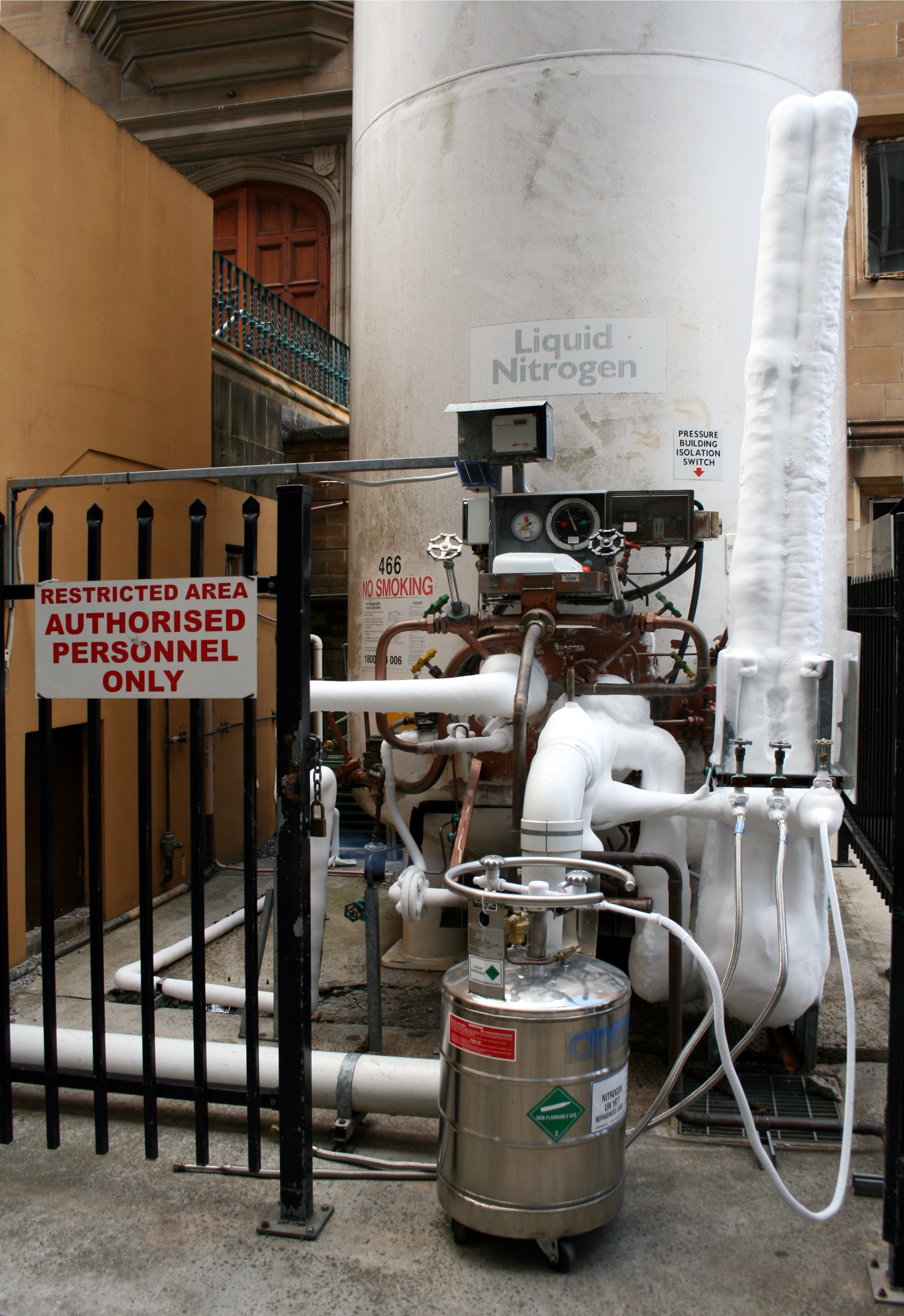
A self-pressurising dewar (silver) being filled with liquid nitrogen from a larger storage tank (white)

A cryogenic storage dewar (or simply dewar) is a specialised type of vacuum flask used for storing cryogens (such as liquid nitrogen or liquid helium), whose boiling points are much lower than room temperature. It is named after inventor James Dewar, who developed it for his own work. They are commonly used in low-temperature physics and chemistry.

Cryogenic storage dewars can range widely in size and may take several different forms, including open buckets, flasks with loose-fitting stoppers, and self-pressurising tanks. All dewars have walls constructed from two or more layers, with a high vacuum maintained between the layers. This provides very good thermal insulation between the interior and exterior of the dewar, which reduces the rate at which the contents boil away. Precautions are taken in the design of dewars to safely manage the gas which is released as the liquid slowly boils.

== Design ==
The simplest dewars allow the gas to escape either through an open top or past a loose-fitting stopper. More sophisticated dewars trap the gas above the liquid, and hold it at high pressure. This increases the boiling point of the liquid, allowing it to be stored for extended periods. Excessive vapour pressure is released automatically through safety valves. Dewars are also designed to be resistant to any sort of puncture to preserve the contents, as cryogens are costly to produce, and some (like helium) are in limited global supply.

The method of decanting liquid from a dewar depends upon its design. Simple dewars may be tilted, to pour liquid from the neck. Self-pressurising designs use the pressure of the gas in the top of the dewar to force the liquid upward through a pipe leading to the neck.

=== Safety ===
Selected expansion ratios
Cryogenic fluid	Expansion ratio
nitrogen (LN2)	1:696
helium (LHe)	1:757
argon (LAr)	1:847
hydrogen (LH2)	1:851
oxygen (LO2)	1:860
neon (LNe)	1:1438

Cryogens present several safety hazards, and their storage vessels are designed to reduce the associated risk.

Firstly, no dewar can provide perfect thermal insulation and the cryogenic liquid slowly boils away, which yields an enormous quantity of gas. In dewars with an open top, the gas simply escapes into the surrounding area. However, very high pressures can build up inside sealed dewars, and precautions are taken to minimise the risk of explosion. One or more pressure-relief valves allow gas to vent away from the dewar whenever the pressure becomes excessive. In an incident in 2006 at Texas A&M University, the pressure-relief devices of a tank of liquid nitrogen were sealed with brass plugs. As a result, the tank failed catastrophically and exploded.

Secondly, if a dewar is left open to the air for extended periods, atmospheric chemicals can condense or freeze on contact with the cryogenic material. This can introduce contaminants. If these materials freeze, for example, water vapor becoming ice, they can block the openings, leading to pressure buildup and the risk of an explosion.

Thirdly, the gas escaping from a dewar can gradually displace the oxygen from the air in the surrounding area, which presents an asphyxiation hazard. Users are trained to store dewars only in a well-ventilated area, and before transporting dewars in an elevator, the excess gas pressure is vented away and the dewars are sent unaccompanied to their destination.
