= Space Nuclear Propulsion Office =

Extinct US government agency

The United States Space Nuclear Propulsion Office (SNPO) was a US government agency created in 1961 in response to NASA Marshall Space Flight Center's desire to explore the use of nuclear thermal rockets created by Project Rover in NASA space exploration activities.

== Background and founding ==
Because Project Rover fell under the aegis of the Atomic Energy Commission, a way had to be found for NASA and the AEC to share a large, expensive, classified program; specifically, Los Alamos was developing technology for NASA to use.

A "program office" was created in Washington, D.C. under the executive branch of the U.S. government. The director of SNPO was H. B. Finger, known as Harry Finger, an executive branch employee. The deputy director of SNPO was Milton Klein, an AEC employee. The rest of the SNPO staff, approximately twenty people, was a combination of NASA and AEC employees. Their responsibilities included "program and resource planning and evaluation, the justification and distribution of program resources, the definition and control of overall program requirements, monitoring and reporting of progress and problems to NASA and AEC management, and the preparation of testimony to Congress.

== Activity ==
SNPO was specifically tasked with creating the NERVA nuclear thermal rocket program, and immediately upon SNPO's formation it chose Aerojet and Westinghouse as NERVA's principal contractors. SNPO also chose contractors to build reactor and fuel test facilities. SNPO directed NASA funding to non-nuclear components, "engine system development, and design and construction of engine test facilities".

There were three SNPO Field Offices as well. The Cleveland extension (SNPO-C), located at NASA Lewis Research Center was responsible for the management of NERVA Engine Technology Development, including the activities of industrial contractors and the construction of the new NERVA test facilities at the Nevada Test Site. The Nevada Extension (SNPO-N) managed the test site activities. The Albuquerque Extension (SNPO-A) provided liaison with LASL, which was developing the Kiwi and Phoebus reactor research programs. Los Alamos worked on reactors with progressively higher temperatures, power density and power, along with the non-trivial problem of fuel corrosion. SNPO also had the authority to choose the technical direction for KIWI and Phoebus development at LASL.

== Final years and dissolution ==
Finger left SNPO in early 1969 to become NASA's Associate Administrator for Organization and Management. He was replaced by Milton Klein. The Space Nuclear Propulsion Office came to an end when the Nixon administration ended the NERVA program in 1972.
